= List of child saints =

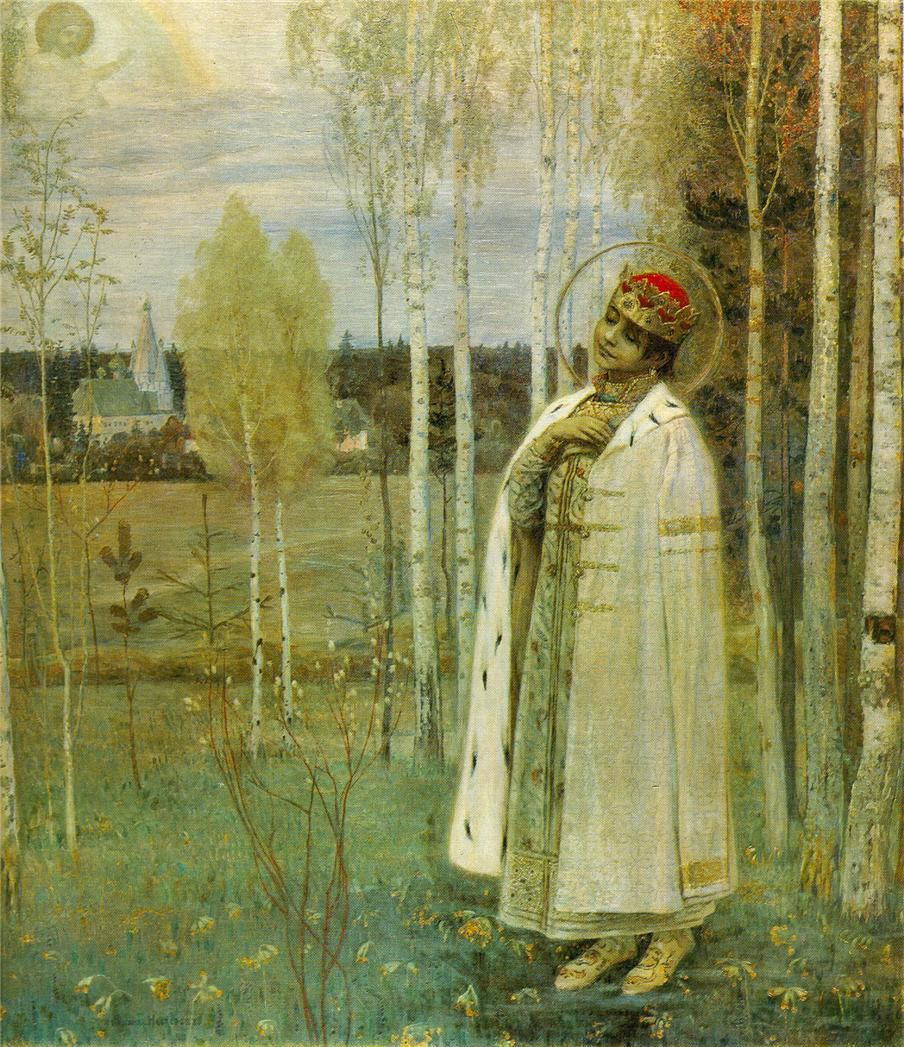
Saint Tsarevich Dmitry of Uglich (1582–1591), 1899 painting by Mikhail Nesterov

Child saints have been venerated in Christianity since the early second century. The earliest example of child saints are the Holy Innocents, recorded in Matthew 2 in the New Testament; Bethlehemite children under the age of 2 who were killed by King Herod the Great in his attempt to kill Baby Jesus.

This list contains Christian children under the age of 18 who are venerated as saints in at least one Christian confession.

== Pre-Schism saints ==
| Image | Name | Age | Born (Year) | Died (Year) | Notes |
|---|---|---|---|---|---|
| | Abanoub of Nehis | 12 | | 303–311 | Martyr |
| | Agapitus of Palestrina | 16 | c. 251 / c. 258 | c. 267 / c. 274 | Martyr |
| | Agnes of Rome | 13 | c. 291 | 21 January 304 | Virgin Martyr |
| | Aquilina of Byblos | 11–12 | 281 | 13 June 293 | Martyr |
| | Barulas | 7 | 295 / 296 | 303 | Martyr |
| | Celsus | 9 | 1st century | 1st century | Martyr |
| | Cessianus | 8 | c. 295 | 303 | Martyr |
| | Crescentius of Rome | 11 | c. 292 | c. 303 | Martyr |
| | Cyricus of Antioch | 3 | c. 301 | c. 304 | Martyr, son of St. Julitta |
| | Dentelin of Mons | 7 | c. 649 | 16 March 656 | Son of Saints Vincent Madelgarius and Waltrude |
| | Dymphna of Ireland | 15 | 7th century | 7th century | Virgin Martyr, who was decapitated by her own father for refusing to marry him |
| | Eulalia of Barcelona | 13 | c. 291 | c. 304 | Virgin Martyr |
| | Eulalia of Mérida | 12–14 | | c. 304 | Virgin Martyr |
| | Faith, Hope, and Charity | 12, 10, and 9 | 2nd century | 2nd century | Martyrs and daughters of St. Sophia of Rome |
| | Fausta of Cyzicus | 13 | c. 298 | c. 311 | Martyr |
| | Fusca of Ravenna | 15 | c. 235 | c. 250 | Martyr |
| | Justin of Paris | | | | |
| | Justus and Pastor | 13 and 9 | c. 290 – c. 295 | c. 304 | Martyrs |
| | Justus of Beauvais | 9 | 277 / 278 | 287 | Martyr |
| | Leonidas of Constantinople | | unknown | unknown | Martyr |
| | Majoricus | | unknown | 484 | Martyr |
| | Martialis | | | 165 | Martyr, son of St. Felicitas of Rome |
| | Matrona of Thessalonica | | | | Virgin Martyr |
| | Olivia of Palermo | 14/15 | 448 | 10 June 463 | Virgin Martyr |
| | Pancras of Rome | 14 | c. 289 | 12 May 303 / 304 | Martyr |
| | Pelagius of Constance | 13–20 | c. 270 | c. 283 | Hieromartyr, deacon |
| | Pelagius of Córdoba | | | | |
| | Philomena of Rome | | | | |
| | Ponticus | | | | |
| | Prisca | 13 | | | |
| | Rais | | | 303 | Virgin Martyr |
| | Reparata | 11–20 | | | Virgin Martyr |
| | Richard of Pontoise | | | | |
| | Rudolph of Berne | | | | |
| | Rumbold of Buckingham | | | | |
| | Sicarius of Brantôme | | | | |
| | Solange of Bourges | | | 880 | Martyr |
| | Tarcisius | | 3rd century | 3rd century | Martyr |
| | Tremorus of Brittany | | 6th century | 6th century | Martyr, son of St. Tryphine; beheaded by his own stepfather |
| | Vasilissa | 9 | 300 | 309 | Martyr |
| | Vibiana | | 3rd century | 3rd century | Virgin Martyr |
| | Victalicus | | | | Martyr |

== Eastern Orthodox Church ==
| Name | Born | Died | Age | Country | Church | Cause | Notes |
|---|---|---|---|---|---|---|---|
Saints
| Demetrius of Uglich | October 19, 1582 | May 15, 1591 | 8 | Russia | Russian Orthodox Church | Martyr | Prince (Tsarevich) of All Russia |
| Bogolep of Chorny Yar | May 2, 1647 | August 1, 1654 | 7 | Russia | Russian Orthodox Church | Venerable | locally |
| Gabriel of Białystok | April 2, 1684 | April 20, 1690 | 6 | Poland | Russian Orthodox Church | Martyr | |
| Peter the Aleut | c. 1800 | September 24, 1815 | 15 | United States | Russian Orthodox Church | Martyr | |
| Anastasia Nikolaevna Romanova | June 18, 1901 | July 17, 1918 | 17 | Russia | Russian Orthodox Church | Martyr | Part of the Romanov Martyrs |
| Alexei Nikolaevich Romanov | August 12, 1904 | July 17, 1918 | 13 | Russia | Russian Orthodox Church | Martyr | Part of the Romanov Martyrs |
Candidates for glorification
| Tereza Luiz Rosa | c. 1972/1973 | 4 April 1986 | 13 | Brazil | UAOC in Diaspora | Innocents | Students who died in a school fire along with their teacher Maria Beruski |
| Carlos Luiz Rosa | c. 1972/1973 | 4 April 1986 | 11 | Brazil | UAOC in Diaspora | Innocents | Students who died in a school fire along with their teacher Maria Beruski |
| Amaury M. de Queiroz | c. 1972/1973 | 4 April 1986 | 9 | Brazil | UAOC in Diaspora | Innocents | Students who died in a school fire along with their teacher Maria Beruski |
| Lucélia Glomba | c. 1977/1978 | 4 April 1986 | 8 | Brazil | UAOC in Diaspora | Innocents | Students who died in a school fire along with their teacher Maria Beruski |
| Lucimeire Borandelik | c. 1977/1978 | 4 April 1986 | 8 | Brazil | UAOC in Diaspora | Innocents | Students who died in a school fire along with their teacher Maria Beruski |
| Salomão Bachtich | c. 1977/1978 | 4 April 1986 | 8 | Brazil | UAOC in Diaspora | Innocents | Students who died in a school fire along with their teacher Maria Beruski |
| Laert Luiz Rosa | c. 1978/1979 | 4 April 1986 | 7 | Brazil | UAOC in Diaspora | Innocents | Students who died in a school fire along with their teacher Maria Beruski |
| Alexandra Marim | c. 1978/1979 | 4 April 1986 | 7 | Brazil | UAOC in Diaspora | Innocents | Students who died in a school fire along with their teacher Maria Beruski |

== Episcopal Church ==
| Name | Born | Died | Age | Country | Religion | Cause | Notes |
|---|---|---|---|---|---|---|---|
Models of Faith
| Tārore | c. 1824 | October 1836 | 12 | New Zealand | Anglicanism | Martyrs | Lay Evangelist, Church Mission Society |
| Manche Masemola | 1913 | 4 February 1928 | 15 | South Africa | Anglicanism | Martyrs | |
| Anne Frank | June 12, 1929 | February 1945 | 15 | Germany | Judaism | Martyrs | |
| 148 Student Martyrs of Garissa | Various | 2 April 2015 | Various | Kenya | Protestantism | Martyrs | |
| Arasalan Masih | 2000/2001 | 9 October 2017 | 16 | Pakistan | Protestantism | Martyrs | |

== Catholic Church ==
| Name | Born | Died | Age | Country | Diocese | Cause | Notes |
|---|---|---|---|---|---|---|---|
Saints
| Fina | 1238 | 12 March 1253 | 15 | Italy | Siena | Heroic virtue | |
| Cristobal, Juan and Antonio | c. 1514 – c. 1517 | 1527 and 1529 | 12–13 | Mexico | Tlaxcala | Martyrs in odium fidei | |
| Stanisław Kostka | 28 October 1550 | 15 August 1568 | 17 | Poland; Italy | Rome | Heroic virtue | Novice, Jesuits |
| Pedro Calungsod | c. 1654 | 2 April 1672 | 17 | Philippines | Cebu | Martyr in odium fidei | |
| Domenico Savio | 2 April 1842 | 9 March 1857 | 14 | Italy | Turin | Heroic virtue | |
| Maria Goretti | 16 October 1890 | 6 July 1902 | 11 | Italy | Albano | Martyr in defensum castitatis | |
| Francisco Marto | 11 July 1908 | 4 April 1919 | 10 | Portugal | Leiria-Fátima | Heroic virtue | |
| Jacinta Marto | 11 March 1910 | 20 February 1920 | 9 | Portugal | Leiria-Fátima | Heroic virtue | |
| José Sánchez del Río | March 28, 1913 | February 10, 1928 | 14 | Mexico | Zamora | Martyr in odium fidei | |
| Carlo Acutis | May 3, 1991 | October 11, 2006 | 15 | United Kingdom; Italy | Milan | Heroic virtue | First Millennial Canonized |
Blesseds
| Marguerite la Fière | 1207 | 1220 | 12–13 | France | Antwerp | Martyr in defensum castitatis | |
| Imelda Lambertini | c. 1320 | May 12, 1333 | 11 | Italy | Bologna | Heroic virtue | Member, Lay Dominicans |
| Panacea De' Muzzi | 1378 | 1383 | 15 | Italy | Novara | Martyr in odium fidei | |
| Pierre de Luxembourg | 1369 | 1387 | 17 | France | Metz | Heroic virtue | Bishop of Metz |
| Lorenzino Sossio | ? | April 1485 | 7–9 | Italy | Padua and Vicenza | Martyr in odium fidei | |
| Laura Vicuña | April 5, 1891 | January 22, 1904 | 12 | Chile; Argentina | Viedma | Heroic virtue | |
| Karolina Kózka | August 2, 1898 | November 18, 1914 | 16 | Poland | Tarnów | Martyr in defensum castitatis | |
| Daudi Okelo | c. 1902 | October 18, 1918 | 16 | Uganda | Gulu | Martyr in odium fidei | |
| Jildo Irwa | c. 1906 | October 18, 1918 | 12 | Uganda | Gulu | Martyr in odium fidei | |
| Adílio Daronch | October 25, 1908 | May 21, 1924 | 15 | Brazil | Frederico Westphalen | Martyr in odium fidei | |
| Albertina Berkenbrock | April 11, 1919 | June 15, 1931 | 12 | Brazil | Tubarão | Martyr in defensum castitatis | |
| Antonia Mesina | June 21, 1919 | May 17, 1935 | 15 | Italy | Nuoro | Martyr in defensum castitatis | Member of Catholic Action |
| Sesilia Butsi | December 16, 1924 | December 26, 1940 | 16 | Thailand | Thare and Nonseng | Martyrs in odium fidei | |
| Bibiana Khampai | November 4, 1925 | December 26, 1940 | 15 | Thailand | Thare and Nonseng | Martyrs in odium fidei | |
| Maria Phon | January 6, 1929 | December 26, 1940 | 11 | Thailand | Thare and Nonseng | Martyrs in odium fidei | |
| Benigna Cardoso da Silva | October 15, 1928 | October 24, 1941 | 13 | Brazil | Crato | Martyr in defensum castitatis | |
| Stanisława Ulma | July 18, 1936 | March 24, 1944 | 7 | Poland | Przemyśl | Martyrs in odium fidei | Killed by the Nazis |
| Barbara Ulma | October 6, 1937 | March 24, 1944 | 6 | Poland | Przemyśl | Martyrs in odium fidei | Killed by the Nazis |
| Władysław Ulma | December 5, 1938 | March 24, 1944 | 5 | Poland | Przemyśl | Martyrs in odium fidei | Killed by the Nazis |
| Franciszek Ulma | April 3, 1940 | March 24, 1944 | 4 | Poland | Przemyśl | Martyrs in odium fidei | Killed by the Nazis |
| Antoni Ulma | June 6, 1941 | March 24, 1944 | 2 | Poland | Przemyśl | Martyrs in odium fidei | Killed by the Nazis |
| Maria Ulma | June 6, 1941 | March 24, 1944 | 2 | Poland | Przemyśl | Martyrs in odium fidei | Killed by the Nazis |
| Unnamed baby Ulma | March 24, 1944 | March 24, 1944 | 0 (stillbirth) | Poland | Przemyśl | Martyrs in odium fidei | Killed by the Nazis; the first baby in formation with the title of blessed |
| Anna Kolesárová | July 14, 1928 | November 22, 1944 | 16 | Slovakia | Košice | Martyr in defensum castitatis | |
| Rolando Rivi | January 7, 1931 | April 13, 1945 | 14 | Italy | Reggio Emilia-Guastalla | Martyr in odium fidei | Diocesan seminarian |
| Thomas Khampheuane Inthirath | May 1952 | May 12, 1968 | 16 | Laos | Pakse | Martyr in odium fidei | |
| Nelson Rutilio Lemus Chávez | November 10, 1960 | March 12, 1977 | 16 | El Salvador | San Salvador | Martyr in odium fidei | |
| Juan Barrera Méndez | August 4, 1967 | January 8, 1980 | 12 | Guatemala | Quiché | Martyr in odium fidei | Member of Catholic Action |
Venerables
| Galileo Nicolini (Gabriele of Our Lady of the Sacred Heart) | June 17, 1882 | May 13, 1897 | 14 | Italy | Pitigliano-Sovana-Orbetello | Heroic virtue | Novice, Passionists |
| Maggiorino Vigolungo | May 6, 1904 | July 27, 1918 | 14 | Italy | Alba | Heroic virtue | Seminarian, Society of Saint Paul |
| Anne de Guigné | April 25, 1911 | January 14, 1922 | 10 | France | Annecy and Nice | Heroic virtue | |
| Pasquale Canzii | November 6, 1914 | January 26, 1930 | 15 | Italy | Pescara-Penne | Heroic virtue | Diocesan seminarian |
| Antonietta Meo | December 15, 1930 | July 3, 1937 | 6 | Italy | Rome | Heroic virtue | |
| María del Carmen González-Valerio Sáenz de Heredia | March 14, 1930 | July 17, 1939 | 9 | Spain | Madrid | Heroic virtue | |
| Odette Vidal Cardoso de Oliveira | September 15, 1930 | November 25, 1939 | 9 | Brazil | São Sebastião do Rio de Janeiro | Heroic virtue | |
| Maria Carmelina Leone | July 11, 1923 | October 1, 1940 | 17 | Italy | Palermo | Heroic virtue | |
| Rachelina Ambrosini | July 2, 1925 | March 10, 1941 | 15 | Italy | Benevento | Heroic virtue | |
| Bernhard Lehner | January 4, 1930 | January 24, 1944 | 14 | Germany | Regensburg | Heroic virtue | |
| María Montserrat Grases García | July 10, 1941 | March 26, 1959 | 17 | Spain | Barcelona | Heroic virtue | Member, Opus Dei Movement |
| María del Pilar Cimadevilla López-Dóriga | February 17, 1952 | March 6, 1962 | 10 | Spain | Madrid | Heroic virtue | |
| Angelo [Angiolino] Bonetta | September 18, 1948 | January 28, 1963 | 14 | Italy | Brescia | Heroic virtue | Member, Silent Workers of the Cross |
| Faustino Pérez-Manglano Magro | August 4, 1946 | March 3, 1963 | 16 | Spain | Valencia | Heroic virtue | Postulant, Society of Mary (Marianists) |
| Nelson [Nelsinho] Santana | July 31, 1955 | December 24, 1964 | 9 | Brazil | São Carlos | Heroic virtue | |
| Maria Orsola Bussone | October 2, 1954 | July 10, 1970 | 15 | Italy | Turin | Heroic virtue | Member, Focolare Movement |
| Silvio Dissegna | July 1, 1967 | September 24, 1979 | 12 | Italy | Turin | Heroic virtue | |
| Alexia González-Barros González | March 7, 1971 | December 5, 1985 | 14 | Spain | Madrid | Heroic virtue | Member, Opus Dei Movement |
Servants of God
| Arcangela Filippelli | March 17, 1853 | February 7, 1869 | 12 | Italy | Cosenza-Bisignano | Martyr in defensum castitatis | |
| Catharina Iwanaga Mori | 1865 | September 4, 1871 | 5 | Japan | Hiroshima | Martyr in odium fidei | |
| Maria Lichtenegger | August 4, 1906 | July 8, 1923 | 16 | Austria | Graz-Seckau | Heroic virtue | |
| Guy Pierre de Fontgalland | November 30, 1913 | January 24, 1925 | 11 | France | Paris | Heroic virtue | |
| Gaetana [Agata Tanina] Nastasi | March 2, 1914 | April 4, 1926 | 12 | Italy | Acireale | Heroic virtue | |
| Antônio [Antoninho] da Rocha Marmo | October 19, 1918 | December 21, 1930 | 12 | Brazil | São Paulo | Heroic virtue | |
| Anfronsina Berardi | December 6, 1920 | March 13, 1933 | 12 | Italy | L'Aquila | Heroic virtue | |
| Aldo Blundo | January 23, 1919 | December 5, 1934 | 15 | Italy | Naples | Heroic virtue | |
| Maria Vieira da Silva | November 11, 1926 | June 4, 1940 | 13 | Portugal | Angra | Martyr in defensum castitatis | |
| Maria da Conceição [Sãozinha] Froes Gil Ferrão de Pimentel Teixeira | February 1, 1923 | June 6, 1940 | 17 | Portugal | Lisbon | Heroic virtue | |
| Giuseppe Ottone | March 18, 1928 | February 8, 1941 | 12 | Italy | Naples | Heroic virtue | |
| Hermann Wijns | March 15, 1931 | May 26, 1941 | 10 | Belgium | Antwerp | Heroic virtue | |
| Anna Marie Zelíková | July 19, 1924 | September 11, 1941 | 17 | Czech Republic | Olomouc | Heroic virtue | Member, Lay Carmelites |
| Margherita Candia | August 24, 1924 | May 24, 1942 | 17 | Italy | Sorrento-Castellammare di Stabia | Heroic virtue | |
| Ulrico Sarti | July 1, 1930 | July 31, 1942 | 11 | Italy | Ravenna-Cervia | Heroic virtue | |
| Ramón Montero Navarro | January 7, 1930 | February 2, 1944 | 14 | Spain | Ciudad Real | Heroic virtue | Member, Lay Carmelites |
| Domenico Zamberletti | August 24, 1936 | May 29, 1950 | 13 | Italy | Milan | Heroic virtue | |
| Josefina Vilaseca Alsina | March 9, 1940 | December 25, 1952 | 12 | Spain | Vic | Martyr in defensum castitatis | |
| Santos Franco Sánchez | July 6, 1942 | February 6, 1954 | 11 | Spain | Córdoba | Heroic virtue | |
| María Isabel Acuña Arias (Marisa) | March 5, 1941 | August 15, 1954 | 13 | Costa Rica | San José de Costa Rica | Heroic virtue | |
| Charlene Marie Richard | January 13, 1947 | August 11, 1959 | 12 | United States | Lafayette | Heroic virtue | |
| Angela Iacobellis | October 16, 1948 | March 27, 1961 | 12 | Italy | Naples | Heroic virtue | |
| Paola Adamo | October 24, 1963 | June 28, 1978 | 14 | Italy | Taranto | Heroic virtue | |
| María Sagrario Fernández Jiménez | May 26, 1966 | February 22, 1979 | 12 | Spain | Toledo | Heroic virtue | |
| Lorena d’Alessandro | November 20, 1964 | April 3, 1981 | 16 | Italy | Rome | Heroic virtue | |
| Pietrino di Natale | December 10, 1966 | August 20, 1984 | 17 | Italy | Teramo-Atri | Heroic virtue | |
| Niña Ruiz Abad | October 31, 1979 | August 16, 1993 | 13 | Philippines | Laoag | Heroic virtue | |
| Clarita Maria Segura | May 15, 1978 | March 7, 1995 | 16 | Argentina | Buenos Aires | Heroic virtue | |
| Amanda Gilseth [Amandita] Ruiz Suarez | May 11, 1999 | September 21, 2005 | 6 | Venezuela | San Cristóbal de Venezuela | Heroic virtue | |
| Pierangelo Capuzzimati | June 28, 1990 | April 30, 2008 | 17 | Italy | Taranto | Heroic virtue | |
| Vivian Uchechi Ogu | April 1, 1995 | November 15, 2009 | 14 | Nigeria | Benin City | Martyr in defensum castitatis | |
| Anne-Gabrielle Caron | January 29, 2002 | July 23, 2010 | 8 | France | Fréjus-Toulon | Heroic virtue | |
| Adam Adi Zuhayr Marzina Arab | June 12, 2007 | October 31, 2010 | 3 | Iraq | Baghdad of the Syrians | Martyr in odium fidei | Killed in the Baghdad massacre |
| Sandru Yan Yunan al-Sa'ur | August 3, 2010 | October 31, 2010 | 2 months | Iraq | Baghdad of the Syrians | Martyr in odium fidei | Killed in the Baghdad massacre |
| Unnamed unborn child | | October 31, 2010 | 0 | Iraq | Baghdad of the Syrians | Martyr in odium fidei | Killed in the Baghdad massacre |
| Giulia Gabrieli | March 3, 1997 | August 19, 2011 | 14 | Italy | Bergamo | Heroic virtue | |
| Darwin Ramos | December 17, 1994 | September 23, 2012 | 17 | Philippines | Cubao | Heroic virtue | Joyfully Accepted Suffering of Duchenne Muscular Dystrophy |
| Candidates for sainthood | | | | | | | |
| Agnes of Bavaria | 1335 | November 11, 1352 | 17 | Germany | Munich | Heroic virtue | Nun, Poor Clares |
| Miguel de Ayatumo | c. 1593 | November 19, 1609 | 16 | Philippines | Tagbilaran | Heroic virtue | Seminarian, Jesuits |
| Michele Magone | September 19, 1845 | January 21, 1859 | 13 | Italy | Turin | Heroic virtue | |
| Alessandrino Mazzucchi | April 26, 1878 | June 21, 1890 | 12 | Italy | Como | Heroic virtue | |
| Cäcilia Baumann | August 24, 1892 | May 25, 1905 | 12 | Germany | Freiburg im Breisgau | Martyr in defensum castitatis | |
| Ellen Organ | August 24, 1903 | February 2, 1908 | 4 | Ireland | Cork and Ross | Heroic virtue | |
| Laura Klinkenberg | January 9, 1892 | April 30, 1908 | 16 | Belgium; Germany | Aachen | Martyr in defensum castitatis | |
| Gustavo Maria Bruni | May 6, 1903 | February 10, 1911 | 7 | Italy | Turin | Heroic virtue | |
| Maria Izilda de Castro Ribeiro | June 17, 1897 | May 24, 1911 | 13 | Portugal; Brazil | Braga | Heroic virtue | |
| Angelina Zampieri | December 28, 1898 | July 24, 1913 | 14 | Italy | Belluno-Feltre | Martyr in defensum castitatis | |
| Vincenza Carminati | January 7, 1907 | January 9, 1920 | 12 | Italy | Bergamo | Heroic virtue | |
| Maria Grimm | April 17, 1909 | July 3, 1922 | 13 | Germany | Rottenburg-Stuttgart | Martyr in defensum castitatis | |
| Maria Vanderlinden | November 26, 1912 | January 10, 1924 | 11 | Belgium | Antwerp | Heroic virtue | |
| Manuel Melgarejo Nápoles | October 17, 1908 | September 12, 1926 | 17 | Mexico | Mexico City | Martyr in odium fidei | |
| José Natividad Herrera Delgado | September 9, 1911 | November 7, 1926 | 15 | Mexico | San Juan de los Lagos | Martyr in odium fidei | |
| Albert Patin | February 25, 1915 | May 14, 1928 | 13 | France | Dijon | Heroic virtue | |
| Aldo Marcozzi | July 25, 1914 | November 24, 1928 | 14 | Italy | Milan | Heroic virtue | |
| Zenaida Llerenas Torres | June 7, 1913 | November 27, 1928 | 15 | Mexico | Colima | Martyr in odium fidei | |
| Vittorio Tannozzini | April 19, 1926 | May 26, 1935 | 9 | Italy | Acquapendente | Heroic virtue | |
| Nicolino Di Meo | March 5, 1920 | July 2, 1936 | 16 | Italy | Trani-Barletta-Bisceglie | Heroic virtue | Seminarian, Rogationists of the Heart of Jesus |
| Silvio Cirielli | January 3, 1930 | June 30, 1941 | 11 | Italy | Bari-Bitonto | Heroic virtue | |
| Maria Regina Kramer | August 1, 1928 | September 2, 1945 | 17 | Germany | Feldkirch | Martyr in defensum castitatis | |
| Klara Wendehals | January 23, 1936 | March 12, 1952 | 16 | Germany | Paderborn | Martyr in defensum castitatis | |
| Tarcisio Cavara | May 7, 1940 | January 15, 1954 | 13 | Italy | Bologna | Heroic virtue | |
| Brigitte Irrgang | February 10, 1943 | July 4, 1954 | 11 | Germany | Berlin | Martyr in defensum castitatis | |
| Alessandro Poletti | May 1, 1947 | February 4, 1956 | 8 | Italy | Turin | Heroic virtue | |
| Nancy Hamilton | June 20, 1942 | June 7, 1956 | 13 | United States | Monterey (California) | Heroic virtue | |
| Vanilda Sanches Beber | August 3, 1943 | October 6, 1958 | 15 | Brazil | Santo André | Heroic virtue | |
| Marisa Porcellana | December 1, 1946 | July 4, 1960 | 13 | Italy | Turin | Martyr in defensum castitatis | |
| Marisa Morini | c. 1951 | March 1, 1964 | 12 | Italy | Ferrara-Comacchio | Martyr in defensum castitatis | |
| Maria Elizabeth de Oliveira | February 6, 1951 | November 28, 1965 | 14 | Brazil | Passo Fundo | Heroic virtue | |
| Delphine de Fosseux | March 5, 1959 | April 23, 1969 | 15 | France | Nevers | Heroic virtue | |
| Marilena Mottini | April 3, 1954 | September 15, 1969 | 15 | Italy | Bergamo | Martyr in defensum castitatis | |
| Paolo Sempreboni | September 17, 1958 | August 25, 1971 | 12 | Italy | Verona | Heroic virtue | |
| Daniel Croteau | May 27, 1959 | April 14–15, 1972 | 12 | United States | Springfield, Massachusetts | Martyr in defensum castitatis | Altar boy abused and murdered by Father Richard R. Lavigne |
| Ninni Di Leo | April 4, 1957 | January 23, 1974 | 16 | Italy | Palermo | Heroic virtue | |
| Maurilio Coccio | April 19, 1961 | April 2, 1974 | 12 | Italy | Alba Pompeia | Heroic virtue | |
| Luis Alfredo [Luisito] Torres | October 3, 1962 | May 11, 1977 | 14 | El Salvador | San Salvador | Martyr in odium fidei | |
| Roderick Flores | 1969 | August 18, 1984 | 15 | Philippines | Manila | Offer of life | |
| Stefano Bovo | August 10, 1975 | November 20, 1984 | 9 | Italy | Rome | Heroic virtue | Associate, Focolare Movement |
| Sara Matteucci | May 6, 1978 | January 27, 1986 | 7 | Italy | Urbino-Urbania-Sant'Angelo in Vado | Heroic virtue | |
| Santino Calabrò | 1917 | August 27, 1986 | 15 | Italy | Messina-Lipari-Santa Lucia del Mela | Heroic virtue | |
| Silvia Dall'Olio | May 7, 1973 | April 3, 1988 | 14 | Italy | Bologna | Heroic virtue | |
| Celina Maricet Lozano Ramos | February 27, 1973 | November 18, 1989 | 16 | El Salvador | San Salvador | Martyr in odium fidei | |
| Sonia Cutrona | April 17, 1973 | June 18, 1990 | 17 | Italy | Caltagirone | Heroic virtue | |
| Audrey Stevenson | March 22, 1983 | August 22, 1991 | 8 | United States; France | Paris | Heroic virtue | |
| Annamaria Vasta | June 12, 1975 | March 29, 1992 | 16 | Italy | Cuneo | Heroic virtue | |
| Jeanne-Marie Kegelin | July 18, 1994 | June 18, 2002 | 7 | France | Strasbourg | Martyr in defensum castitatis | |
| Melania Russo | May 31, 1988 | December 13, 2003 | 15 | Italy | Oria | Heroic virtue | |
| Mattie Stepanek | July 17, 1990 | June 22, 2004 | 14 | United States | Baltimore | Heroic virtue | |
| Sara Mariucci | December 31, 2002 | August 6, 2006 | 3 | Italy | Gubbio | Heroic virtue | |
| Sara Colagiovanni | January 19, 1998 | April 14, 2008 | 10 | Italy | Viterbo | Heroic virtue | |
| Yara Gambirasio | May 21, 1997 | November 26, 2010 | 13 | Italy | Bergamo | Martyr in defensum castitatis | |
| Ivan Rolfe Banaag | March 22, 2000 | February 18, 2013 | 12 | Philippines | Kalookan | Heroic virtue | Member, Ave Maria Community |
| Antonio Terranova | July 14, 2004 | February 23, 2013 | 8 | Italy | Palermo | Heroic virtue | |
| Brendan Joseph Kelly | May 12, 1997 | April 27, 2013 | 15 | United States | Arlington | Heroic virtue | |
| Filippo Bataloni | | November 20, 2014 | 8 | Italy | Rome | Heroic virtue | |
| Misho Samaan | September 7, 1998 | April 10, 2015 | 17 | Syria | Aleppo of the Syrians | Heroic virtue | Member, Salesian Cooperators |
| Teresa Ruocco | March 26, 2004 | July 29, 2015 | 11 | Italy | Caserta | Heroic virtue | |
| Nicola Perin | February 2, 1998 | December 24, 2015 | 17 | Italy | Adria-Rovigo | Heroic virtue | |
| David Buggi | November 6, 1999 | June 18, 2017 | 17 | Italy | Rome | Heroic virtue | Member, Neocatechumenal Way |
| Sandor Manuel Pineda Dolmus | | June 14, 2018 | 15 | Nicaragua | León (Nicaragua) | Martyr in odium fidei | |
| Axl Jan Rose Juni | September 19, 2002 | October 20, 2019 | 17 | Philippines | Parañaque | Heroic virtue | |
| Teresita Castillo de Diego | | March 7, 2021 | 10 | Spain | Madrid | Heroic virtue | |
| Karoline Verri Alves | October 7, 2005 | June 19, 2023 | 17 | Brazil | Londrina | Heroic virtue | |
| Luan Augusto da Silva | October 5, 2006 | June 20, 2023 | 16 | Brazil | Londrina | Heroic virtue | |
| Indi Gregory | February 24, 2023 | November 13, 2023 | 8 months | United Kingdom | Nottingham | Heroic virtue | |

== Groups of martyrs ==
| Name | Born | Died | Age | Country | Diocese | Status | Notes |
|---|---|---|---|---|---|---|---|
Martyrs of the French Revolution (1792–1796)
| 110 Infant and Child Martyrs of Luçon | Various | February 28, 1794 | 15 days–7 yrs | France | Luçon | Servants of God | |
Martyrs of Uganda (1885–1887)
| Denis Ssebuggwawo Wasswa | c. 1870 | May 25, 1886 | 16 | Uganda | Kampala | Saints | |
| Achilleus Kiwanuka | c. 1869 | June 3, 1886 | 17 | Uganda | Kampala | Saints | |
| Gyaviira Musoke | c. 1869 | June 3, 1886 | 17 | Uganda | Kampala | Saints | |
| Mbaga Tuzinde | c. 1869 – c. 1870 | June 3, 1886 | 17–18 | Uganda | Kampala | Saints | |
| Mugagga Lubowa | c. 1869 – c. 1870 | June 3, 1886 | 17–18 | Uganda | Kampala | Saints | |
| Kizito | c. 1872 | June 3, 1886 | 14 | Uganda | Kampala | Saints | |
Martyrs of Eastern Europe under Communist Regimes
| Margaretha Wiewiorra | October 15, 1928 | March 9, 1945 | 16 | Poland | Warmia | Servant of God | |
Martyrs of Korea (1901–1974)
| Eun-Cheol Patricius | May 18, 1933 | May 14, 1949 | 15 | North Korea | Pyongyang | Servant of God | |
| Gim Un-sam Iosephus | June 29, 1934 | December 1949 | 15 | North Korea | Pyongyang | Servant of God | |

=== Martyrs of China ===
- Andreas Wang Tianqing
- Anna Wang
- Anna Zhao Shangniuzhe
- Ioannes Baptista Wu Mantang
- Ioannes Baptista Zhu Wurui
- John the New Martyr of China
- Lucia Wang Cheng
- Magdalene Du Fengju
- Maria Chi Yu
- Maria Fan
- Maria Fan Kun
- Maria Zhao
- Maria Zheng Xu
- Paulus Lang Fu
- Paulus Wu Wanshu
- Petrus Hou Zhanou
- Petrus Zhu Rixin
- Simon Qin Chunfu
- Zhuze Chi

=== Martyrs of Japan ===
- Daughter of Shichizaemon and Magdalena (name unknown, age 3)
- Daughter of Shichizaemon and Magdalena (name unknown, age 5)
- Andreas Yakichi
- Antonius
- Antonius Banzai Orusu
- Antonio of Saint Dominic
- Antonius Ono
- Antonius Uchibori
- Benedictus
- Candidus ‘’bōzu’’
- Catharina Hashimoto
- Didacus Hayashida
- Dominicus Nihachi
- Dominicus of Saint Francis
- Dominicus Tomachi
- Elisabeth Sato
- Franciscus Hashimoto
- Franciscus Nihachi
- Franciscus Takeya
- Franciscus Yakichi
- Gabriel
- Iacobus
- Ignatius
- Ignatius Jorge-Fernandes
- Ignatius Uchibori
- Ioannes Hamanomachi
- Ioannes Mukunō Chōzaburō
- Iusta Amagasu
- Jacobus Hayashida
- John of Goto
- Laurentius Yamada
- Louis Ibaraki
- Lucia
- Lucia Kurogane
- Ludovica Hashimoto
- Ludovicus Ibaraki
- Ludovicus Minami
- Ludovicus Onizuka
- Luis Hashimoto
- Magdalena Hayashida
- Martha (last name unknown, age 1)
- Martha (last name unknown, age 7)
- Michaël Anazawa Osamu
- Michaël Tanda
- Michaël Tomachi
- Monica
- Paulus
- Paulus Tomachi
- Petrus Hamanomachi
- Petrus Hashimoto
- Petrus Hattori
- Petrus Kawano
- Petrus Nagaishi
- Regina
- Romanus Anazawa Matsujiro
- Sixtus
- Thecla Kurogane
- Thecla Takahashi
- Thomas Hashimoto
- Thomas Kajiya Yoemon
- Thomas Kozaki
- Thomas Mitsuishi
- Thomas Tomachi
- Ursula Yamamoto

=== Martyrs of Korea ===
- Agatha Kwŏn Chin-i
- Agatha Yi
- Anastasia Yi Bong-geum
- Barbara Sim A-gi
- Barbara Yi
- Iacobus Oh Jong-rye
- Ioannes Yu Mun-seok
- Iosephus Cho Yun-ho
- Joseph Cho Yun-ho
- Lutgarda Yi Sun-i
- Matthaeus Yu Jung-seong
- Petrus Yu Tae-ch’ŏl
- Petrus Chŏng Wŏn-ji

=== Martyrs of Kosheh ===
- Al-Amir Helmy Fahmy
- Maysoon Ghatas Fahmy
- Refaat Fayez Awad Fahmy
- Wael El-Dabai Mikhail

=== Martyrs of Nag Hammadi ===
- Mina Helmy Said
- Bishoy Farid Labib
- Dina Hamalni
- Boula Atef Yassa
- Abanoub Kamal Nashed

=== Martyrs of the Spanish Civil War ===
- Agustín López Hernández
- Agustín Villar Peña
- Alfredo Carrasco Herrero
- Andrés Pérez Fernández
- Ángel Martínez Somolinos
- Àngel Piquer Pellicer
- Antonio Ferrer Rodrigo
- Antonio Leblic Gómez-Lanzas
- Antonio Noguera Martínez
- Antonio Vicente Vaquero Prisuelos
- Bernabé de la Hoz Castillejos
- Emilia Revert Pla
- Emilio Huidobro Corrales
- Emilio Solanes Escrihuela
- Florentino de la Hoz Castillejos
- Francisco Alfredo
- Francisco Luis Pérez-Miravete y Pascual de Riquelme
- Gerardo Pinero Díaz
- Gregorio Urbano Güil Canfrán
- Helí González Navarro
- Ignasi Trias Bertran
- Jesús Brazales Salcedo
- Joan Gamissans Comellas
- Joan Roig Diggle
- José Rodríguez Fernández
- José Sánchez Rodríguez
- José Villacastín Sánchez
- Josep Borràs García
- Juan García-Pulgar García-Ochoa
- Juan Moya Collado
- Julián Mellado Noblejas
- Ladislao Luis
- Lluís Arbós Batista
- Luis Gonzaga Valentín Fernández
- Luis Quintas Durán
- Luis Villar Peña
- María del Carmen Candinas Medina
- Miguel Lloris Miralles
- Nadal Salort Caselles
- Pere Boix Folguera
- Pere Magí
- Rafael Lluch Garín
- Santiago Mosquera Suárez de Figueroa
- Ventura Martín Tejerizo

=== Martyrs of Vietnam ===
- Andrew Trong Van Tram
- Anê Dần
- Giuse Túc
- Thomas Thien Tran

=== Other Catholic Martyrs ===
| Name | Born | Died | Age | Country | Diocese | Cause | Notes |
|---|---|---|---|---|---|---|---|
Martyrs of Nazism (1939–1945)
| Anna Maria Henrica Hamburger | November 8, 1928 | August 9, 1942 | 13 | Germany | 's-Hertogenbosch | Martyrs in odium fidei | |
| Joachim Albertus Maria Hamburger | September 2, 1930 | August 9, 1942 | 11 | Germany | 's-Hertogenbosch | Martyrs in odium fidei | |
| Magdalena Joanna Maria Hamburger | February 5, 1932 | August 9, 1942 | 10 | Germany | 's-Hertogenbosch | Martyrs in odium fidei | |
| Petrus Christianus Maria Hamburger | May 19, 1933 | August 9, 1942 | 9 | Germany | 's-Hertogenbosch | Martyrs in odium fidei | |
| Czesława Kwoka | August 15, 1928 | March 12, 1943 | 14 | Poland | Zamość-Lubaczów | Martyrs in odium fidei | |
| Juraj František Munk | April 16, 1930 | March–April 1940 | 10 | Slovakia | Bratislava | Martyrs in odium fidei | |

== Dubious or fictitious ==
William of Norwich was a twelve year old English boy whose unsolved murder was, at the time, attributed to the Jewish community of Norwich. It is the first known medieval accusation against Jews of ritual murder. E. M. Rose points out that road robberies and kidnappings gone wrong were a frequent cause of death in the region during the period of the Anarchy when the Crown struggled to safeguard the roads. This was followed by a similar allegation regarding the unexplained death of Harold of Gloucester. An attempt to establish a cult of Harold seems to have been unsuccessful. It was never officially supported and died out long before the Reformation. However, it established a pattern. Any unexplained child death occurring near the Easter festival was arbitrarily linked to Jews in the vicinity. In some instances promotion of a cult may have been influenced by the interest of local clergy to enhance the prestige of their church with a shrine. Anthony Bale suggests this, and local politics, may have been contributing factors to the cult of Robert of Bury. Simon of Trent and Werner of Oberwesel are other examples of individuals who died under unknown circumstances, but whose deaths were nonetheless attributed to the Jews.

Little Saint Hugh of Lincoln was never actually canonised, making the moniker "Little Saint Hugh" a misnomer. He was for a short while acclaimed by local people as a saint but never officially recognised as one. Over time, the issue of the rush to sainthood was raised, and Hugh was never canonised, nor included in Catholic martyrology.

In the case of Dominguito del Val, and Andreas Oxner, and the Holy Child of La Guardia it is not clear that the alleged victim ever existed in the first place.

== See also ==
- 498 Spanish Martyrs
- Chinese Martyrs
- Consecrated virgin
- List of Servants of God
- Lists of venerable people (disambiguation)
- List of blesseds
- List of saints
- Persecution of Christians
- Twenty-six Martyrs of Japan
- List of pharaohs deified during lifetime
