= List of Servants of God =

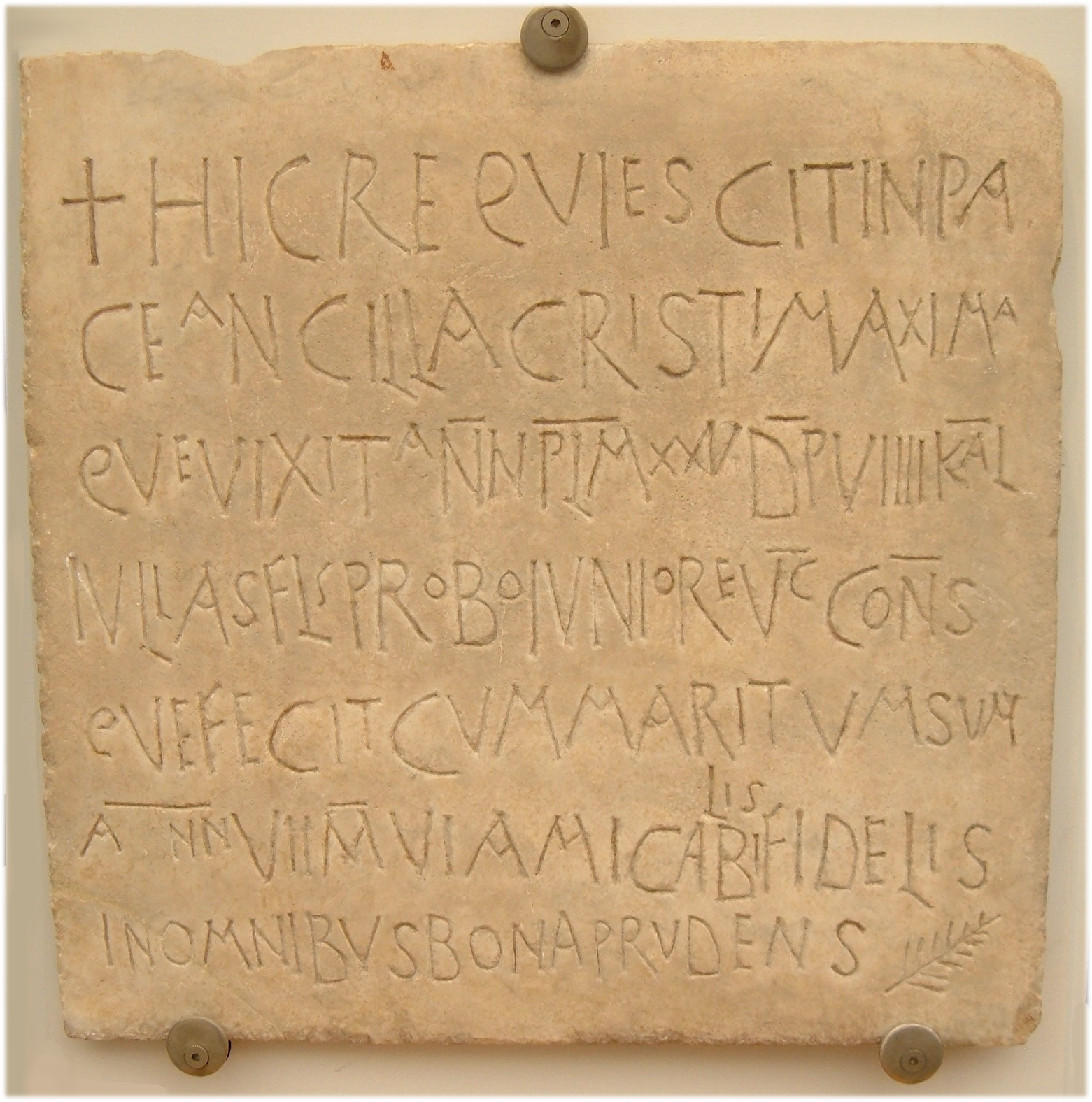
Funerary inscription (AD 525) calling the deceased Maxima an Ancilla Christi ("handmaid of Christ")

In the Catholic Church, Servant of God is a title used for a person for whom a beatification process has been initiated.

The term is used in connection with the opening of the process. The next step may to be declared venerable, upon a decree of heroic virtue or martyrdom. That may be eventually followed by beatification and eventually canonization.

== List ==
The following is an incomplete list of people currently declared to be a Servant of God. The list is in alphabetical order by Christian name but, if necessary, by surname or the place or attribute part of the name.

Servant of God	Year of death	Year declared Servant of God	Notes / References
Adrienne von Speyr	1967	2018	Swiss theologian and physician
Alcide De Gasperi	1954	1993	Prime Minister of Italy
Afonso Sanches, Lord of Albuquerque	1329	1723	Portuguese noble
Ángel Herrera Oria	1968	1996	Spanish cardinal
Angela Iacobellis	1961	1991	
Anita Moreno	1977	2018	Panamanian laywoman
Akash Bashir	2015	2022	Pakistani security guard and martyr
Anna Abrikosova	1936		Russian Greek Catholic, superior of Dominican third order regular sisters
Antony Thachuparambil	1963	2009	
Baudouin of Belgium	1993	2024	King of the Belgians
Barbora Žagarietė	1648	2005	
Bartolomé de las Casas	1566	2002	Spanish priest
Bastiampillai Anthonipillai Thomas	1964	2006	founder of the Congregation of the Rosarians
Pope Benedict XIII	1730	1755	
Bernardin Gantin	2008	2025	Dean of the College of Cardinals
Black Elk	1950	2017	Catechist
Blandina Segale	1941	2015	
Buenaventura Codina y Augerolas	1857	1978	Spanish bishop
Carlo Braga	1971	2013	Italian missionary
Catherine Doherty	1985	2000	Russian writer and founder of the Madonna House Apostolate
Carmen Hernández	2016	2021	Spanish catechist and co-initiator of the Neocatechumenal Way
Cecilia Rosa de Jesús Talangpaz	1731	1999	
Charles Journet	1975		Swiss theologian and cardinal
Chiara Corbella Petrillo	2012	2018	
Cícero Romão Batista	1934	2022	Diocesan priest
Clare Crockett	2016	2024	Irish religious sister and former actress
Dalisay Lazaga	1971	2012	
Darwin Ramos	2012	2019	Filippino layman
Demetrius Augustine Gallitzin	1840	2005	Russian aristocrat, founder of Loretto, Pennsylvania
Dionisia de Santa María Mitas Talangpaz	1732	1999	Filipino nun
Dolindo Ruotolo	1970		Italian diocesan priest
Domingos Chohachi Nakamura	1940	2002	Japanese priest and missionary
Dorothy Day	1980	2000	American laywoman and social activist
Eileen O'Connor	1921	2018	Co-founder of the Society of Our Lady's Nurses for the Poor
Elena of Montenegro, Queen of Italy	1952	2001	
Élisabeth Leseur	1914	1951	French mystic
Élisabeth of France	1794	1953	martyred during French Revolution
Emilia Anne Wojtyła	1929	2020	mother of Pope John Paul II
Emiliano Tardif	1999	2010	
Eugenio Borg	1967	1997	First Superior General of the Society of Christian Doctrine (M.U.S.E.U.M.)
Euzebiusz Huchracki	1942	2003	Polish Franciscan friar
Ezechiele Ramin	1985	2017	Italian missionary priest martyred in Brazil
Ferdinando Casagrande	1944	1998	Salesian priest, killed in the Marzabotto
Fidelis Thaliath	2008	2021	Indian religious sister
Floripes Dornellas de Jesus	1999	2005	Brazilian mystic
Francis II of the Two Sicilies	1894	2020	King of the Two Sicilies
Francis Xavier Ford	1952	2017	Bishop of Kaying
Francisco Rodrigues da Cruz	1948	1951	Portuguese priest
François-Marie-Benjamin Richard	1908		Archbishop of Paris
Frank Duff	1980	1996	Founder of the Legion of Mary
George Vakayil	1931	2013	Indian priest
Giancarlo Rastelli	1970	2005	Italian physician
Gerard Raymond	1932	1968	French-Canadian seminarian
Gordon Anthony Pantin	2000	2013	Archbishop of Port of Spain
Helena Kmieć	2017	2024	Polish missionary
Hélder Pessoa Câmara	1999	2015	Archbishop of Olinda e Recife and cofounder of the Episcopal Conference of Brazil
Henry II the Pious	1241	2015	Polish monarch
Henryk Szuman	1939	2003	martyred in Bydgoszcz
Ida Mari	1981		
Ignacio Larrañaga	2013	2026	Spanish Capuchin priest and founder of the Prayer and Life Workshops
Isaac Hecker	1888	2008	Founder of the Paulist Fathers
Isabella I of Castile	1504	1974	Queen of Castille and León
Jacques de Jésus (Père Jacques)	1945	1997	French Discalced Carmelite priest and headmaster; sheltered Jewish students from the Nazis; named Righteous Among the Nations (1985); died after imprisonment at Mauthausen-Gusen
Jacques Hamel	2016	2017	French Catholic priest killed in the 2016 Normandy church attack
James II of England	1701	1734	Jacobite claimant to the throne of England
Johann Baptist Reus	1947	1953	German priest
John Hardon	2000	2005	American priest
John Peter Savarinayagam	1979	2019	Capuchin priest
Józef Cyrek	1940	1994	Polish writer
Jules Chevalier	1907	2012	Religious priest and founder of the Missionaries of the Sacred Heart and the DOLSH Congregation
Julius Nyerere	1999	2005	First President of Tanzania
Karol Józef Wojtyła Sr.	1941	2020	Father of Pope John Paul II
Léo Tarcísio Gonçalves Pereira	2007	2020	Brazilian Dehonian priest
Luciano Mendes de Almeida	2006	2014	Bishop of Mariana
Luigi Giussani	2005	2012	Founder of Communion and Liberation
Luisa Piccarreta	1947	1994	Italian mystic of Archdiocese of Trani
Luis Chávez	1987	2001	Predecessor to Oscar Romero
Luis Cáncer	1549	2015	Spanish missionary
Maria Clotilde of Savoy	1911	1942	
Marcel Van	1959	1997	
Maria Esperanza de Bianchini	2004	2010	
Marie Gertrude Gros	1905	2012	
Marta Obregón Rodríguez	1992	2011	Martyred for defending her chastity
Mathew Kavukattu	1969	1994	Archbishop of Changanassery
Matilde Salem	1961	1995	Syrian laywoman
Maurice Blondel	1949	2025	Philosopher
Maurice Michael Otunga	2003	2010	The first cardinal of Kenya
Michelle Duppong	2015	2022	FOCUS Missionary
Moises Crespo Gonzalez	1980	2015	Panamanian Augustinian Priest
Patrick Ryan	1878	2016	
Pedro Arrupe	1991	2018	Spanish Basque Jesuit priest and first responder to the atomic bombing of Hiroshima
Piotr Szarek	1939	1994	martyred during Occupation of Poland
Pope Pius VII	1823	2007	
Prosper Guéranger	1875	2005	
Rafael Merry del Val	1930	1953	Spanish cardinal
Raymond FC Mascarenhas	1960	2008	
Reynolds Purackal	1988	2010	
Romano Guardini	1968	2017	Italian priest and philosopher
Rubén Isidro Alonso	1992	2014	Uruguayan Streetwise Priest
Stefano Gobbi	2011	2024	Priest and Founder of the Marian Movement of Priests
Stephen Kim Sou-hwan	2009	2024	Archbishop of Seoul
Sybil Kathigasu	1948	2024	Malayan nurse
Santa Scorese	1991	1998	Martyred for defending her chastity
Sepé Tiaraju	1756	2018	Guarani Leader
Shahbaz Bhatti	2011	2016	Pakistani politician
Stanisław Wiórek	1939	1994	Martyred during the German Occupation of Poland
Terence Cooke	1983	1992	Archbishop of New York and Cardinal
Theodore Foley	1974	2007	Superior general of the Passionists.
Thea Bowman	1990	2018	Religious sister
Therese Neumann	1962	2005	German mystic
Thomas Byles	1912	2015	Roman Catholic priest who died on the Titanic
Thomas Cooray	1988	2010	Sri Lankan cardinal
Toni Zweifel	1989	2018	Swiss engineer and founder of the Limmat Foundation
Ubaldo Marchioni	1944	1998	Priest martyred in Marzabotto
Vincent R. Capodanno	1967	2006	United States Navy chaplain killed in the line of duty
Vital Maria Gonçalves de Oliveira	1878	1994	Bishop of Olinda
Vivian Uchechi Ogu	2009	2023	Martyred for defending her chastity
Willi Graf	1943	2017	Member of the White Rose
William Finnemann	1942	1999	
Xu Guangqi	1633	1933 (redeclared 2011)	Ming-era politician
Zita of Bourbon-Parma	1989	2009	Last Empress Consort of Austria

== See also ==
- List of saints
- List of beatified people
- List of venerated Catholics
- Servants of God by nationality
