= Fusca =

Fusca may refer to:

- Fusca of Ravenna (died c. 250), child saint of the Roman Catholic Church
- Volkswagen Beetle, a 1938–2003 economy car (sold as the "Fusca" in Brazil)
- Volkswagen Beetle (A5), a 2011–2019 compact car (also sold as the "Fusca" in Brazil)
