= María del Carmen González-Valerio =

Spanish venerable (1930–1939)

Venerable María del Carmen González-Valerio
- Born: March 14, 1930; Madrid, Spain
- Died: July 17, 1939 (aged 9); Spain

María del Carmen González-Valerio y Sáenz de Heredia (March 14, 1930 – July 17, 1939) was a Spanish girl. Due to her heroic virtue, when she sacrificed her life to God for the salvation of her father's killers and the persecutors of the church, she was declared venerable by Pope John Paul II on January 16, 1996.

== Life ==
María del Carmen González-Valerio y Sáenz de Heredia was born into a noble, militantly Catholic and Spanish Nationalist family and lived during the turbulent Spanish Civil War. She was a cousin by marriage of politician José Antonio Primo de Rivera. As a child she was known for her deep piety. Her father, Julio González-Valerio, the second son of the Marqués de Casa Ferrandel, was taken away in August 1936 by a group of militia men to be executed. He told his wife, Carmen, to tell their children that: "Our children are too young, they don't understand. Tell them later that their father gave up his life for God and for Spain, so that our children may be raised in a Catholic Spain, where the crucifix reigns over in schools." Their mother sought refuge at the Belgian Embassy in 1937, while Mari Carmen and her siblings were cared for by aunts. The children were also granted asylum when the ambassador learned that the Communists planned to abduct the González-Valerio children and send them to Russia to be raised as Marxists.

The family later sought safety in San Sebastian and Mari Carmen was sent to a boarding school, School of the Reverend Irish Mothers of the Blessed Virgin Mary, in Zalla. She prayed for the conversion of the men who had killed her father. She offered up her own suffering and death for the conversion of politician Manuel Azaña. Supporters for her canonization say that Azaña was converted on his deathbed in 1940. After weeks of illness, Maria del Carmen died of scarlet fever at the age of nine years, four months. She had initially predicted she would die on July 16, the feast of her patron saint, Our Lady of Mount Carmel, but when she learned her aunt would be married on that day, she said she would die on July 17, the following day. Her last words were reportedly "I die as a martyr. Please, doctor, let me go now. Don't you see that the Blessed Virgin has come with the angels to get me?" and "Jesus, Mary, Joseph, may I breathe forth my soul with you." Witnesses at her death bed said her body emitted a sweet perfume.

== Beatification process ==
On January 16, 1996, Pope John Paul II declared María del Carmen González-Valerio venerable. Hagiographies of María Carmen present her as an ideal role model for Catholic children in her practice of her charity, her obedience to her parents, her self-discipline and self-sacrifice, and her extreme modesty.
