= Euzebiusz Huchracki =

Servant of God Euzebiusz Huchracki OFM
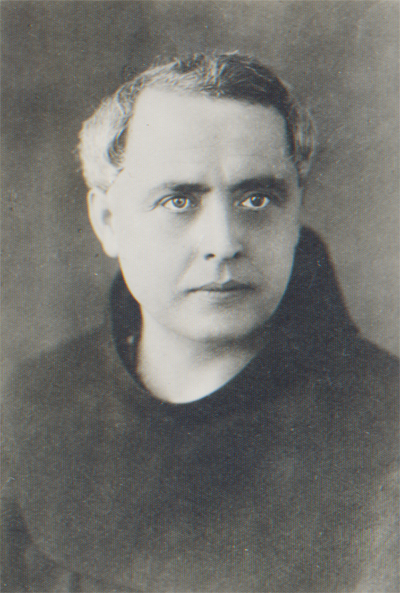
- Born: Józef Huchracki; October 15, 1885; Katowice
- Died: May 6, 1942 (aged 56); Schloss Hartheim

Euzebiusz Huchracki, OFM, (October 15, 1885 – May 6, 1942) was a Polish Franciscan friar and superior of the monastery in Miejska Górka. Shortly after the Nazi invasion of Poland he was arrested by the Gestapo, imprisoned at several places of detention, and lastly deported to the Dachau concentration camp, where he was murdered.

Huchracki is currently one of the 122 Polish martyrs of the Second World War who are included in the beatification process initiated in 1994, whose first session was held in Warsaw in 2003.

== See also ==
- 108 Martyrs of World War II
- List of Servants of God
