= Sicarius of Brantôme =

Child saint

Saint Sicarius of Brantôme
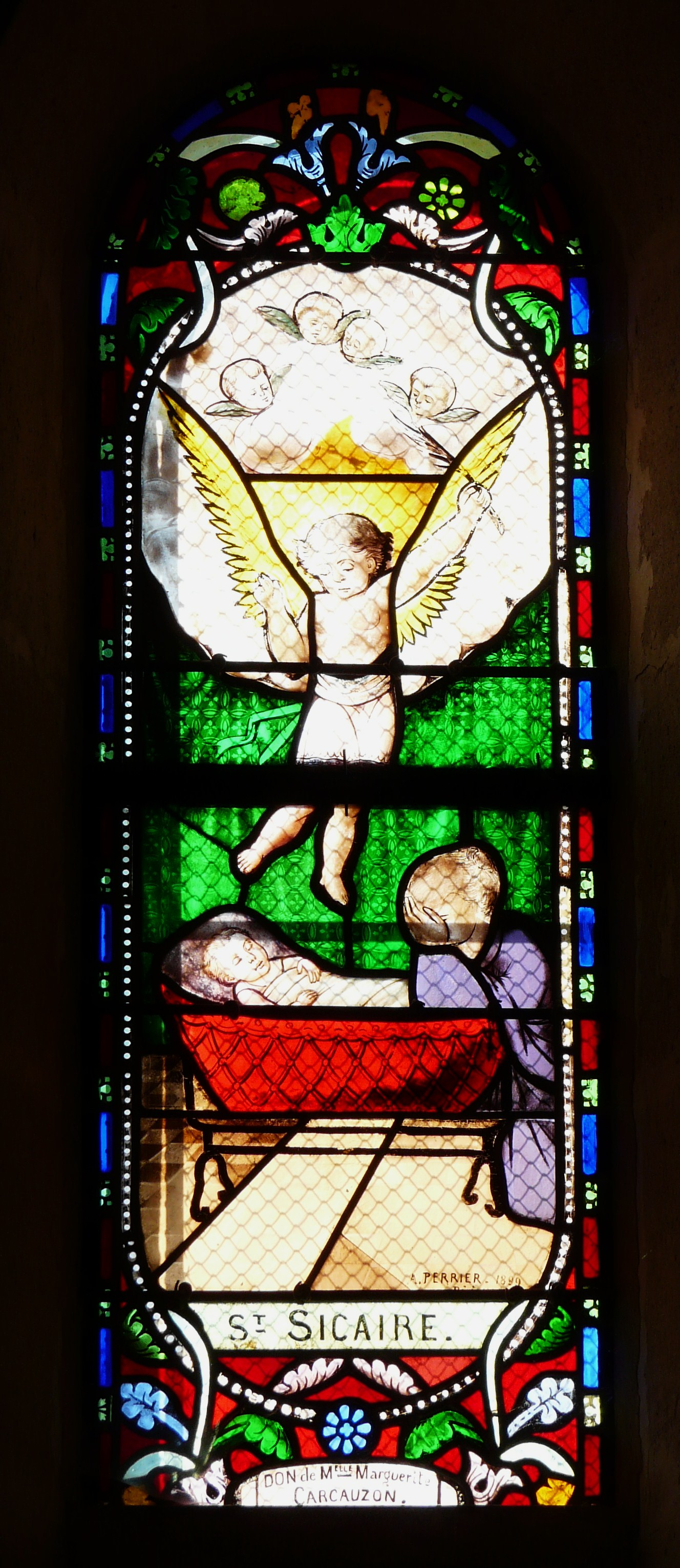
- Stained glass window representing St. Sicarius. Church of Sainte-Madeleine, Montagrier, Dordogne, France.

Martyr
- Died: ~7–2 BC; Bethlehem
- Venerated in: Roman Catholic Church
- Major shrine: Abbey church of Saint-Pierre de Brantôme
- Feast: 2 May
- Attributes: Depicted as an infant
- Patronage: Invoked for general cures

Sicarius of Brantôme or Sicarius of Bethlehem (Sicaire de Brantôme, Sicaire de Bethléem) was a child saint who was venerated from the time of Charlemagne onwards as one of the victims of the Massacre of the Innocents by Herod the Great, said to have occurred in Bethlehem at the time of the birth of Jesus. His remains are housed in the Abbey of Saint-Pierre in Brantôme, Dordogne, France.

== Relics ==
Saint Helen is said to have recovered the relics from the Holy Land in 328 AD. The relics were then brought to the Abbey of Saint-Pierre in Brantôme, Dordogne, by Charlemagne. Saint-Pierre had been founded by Pippin I of Aquitaine. Sicarius' remains are stored in a small glass-and-bronze reliquary mounted on the church wall.

=== Authenticity ===
According to Wasyliw, the bones may simply be those of a child who had been named after a bishop of Laon. In the 19th century, Sabine Baring-Gould was skeptical and wrote that "how the infant of a Hebrew mother acquired a Latin name has not been attempted to be explained". This sentiment was echoed in 2014 by Kristan Lawson and Anneli Rufus:

The massacre happened a long time ago when Jesus, still a baby himself, hadn't yet developed the following that would turn into Christianity. (Thus, you might wonder, how did anyone have the foresight to scoop up this dead baby? Ask not, friend.)

The inscription of the tomb, dedicated to an "innocent" child, may have caused the confusion and the subsequent veneration as a Holy Innocent. Sicarius represents an "impulse to personify the supposedly ancient relic with names may imply a heightened sympathy for the sufferings of the infants, and perhaps for their grieving families as well". Sicarius' name is odd; it means "cut-throat" or "assassin".

St. Memorius (Mémoire) was another child martyr and purported Holy Innocent whose relics were translated during the reign of Charlemagne; they were taken to the Cathedral of St. Front in Périgueux from St. Peter's Basilica in Rome.

A fountain near the monastery of Brantôme is named after Sicarius.

== Images ==
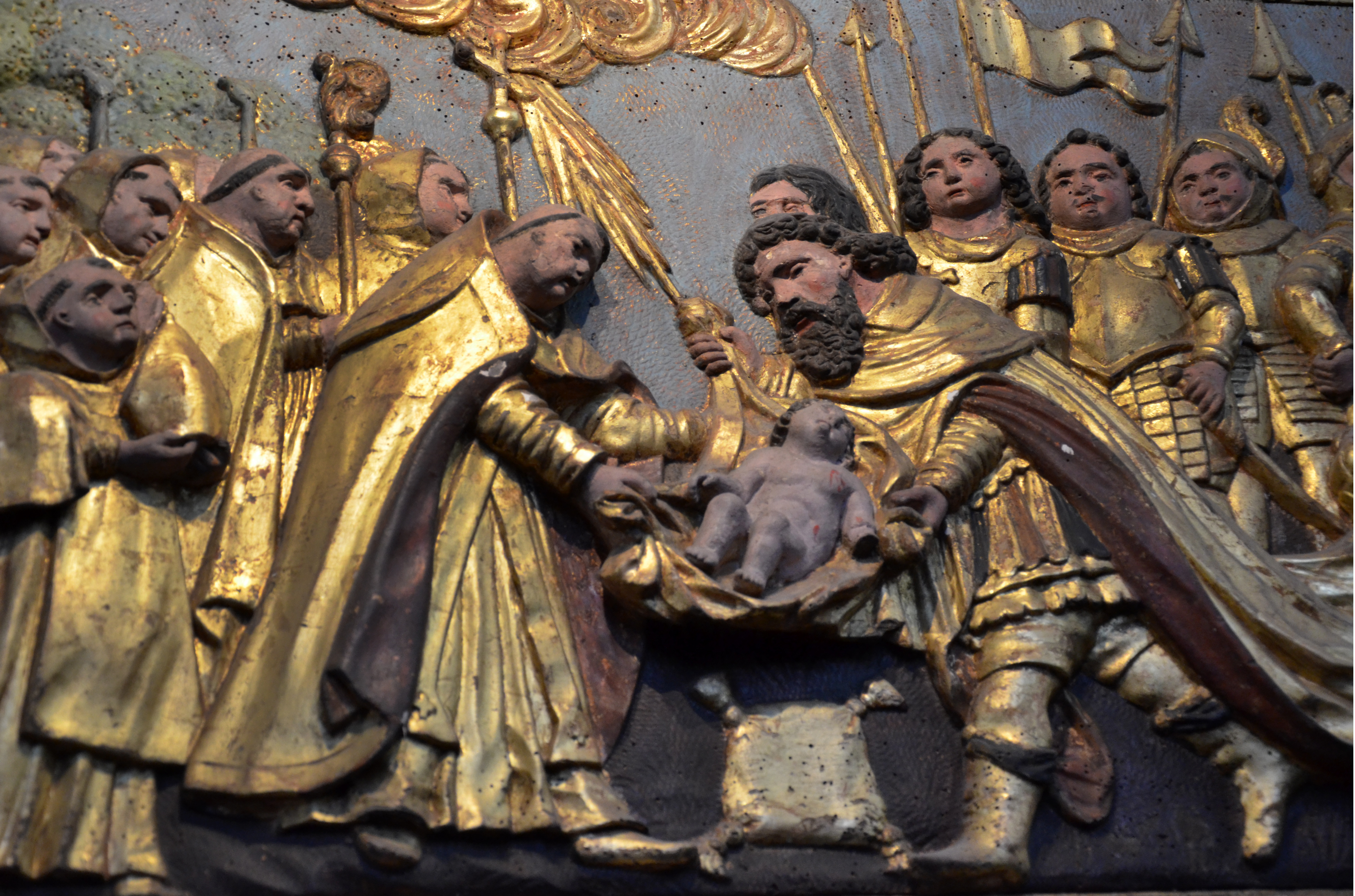
Image from the abbey church of Saint-Pierre de Brantôme. Detail of the central part of a painted carved oak panel, depicting Charlemagne presenting the relics of St. Sicarius to the monks of the abbey.

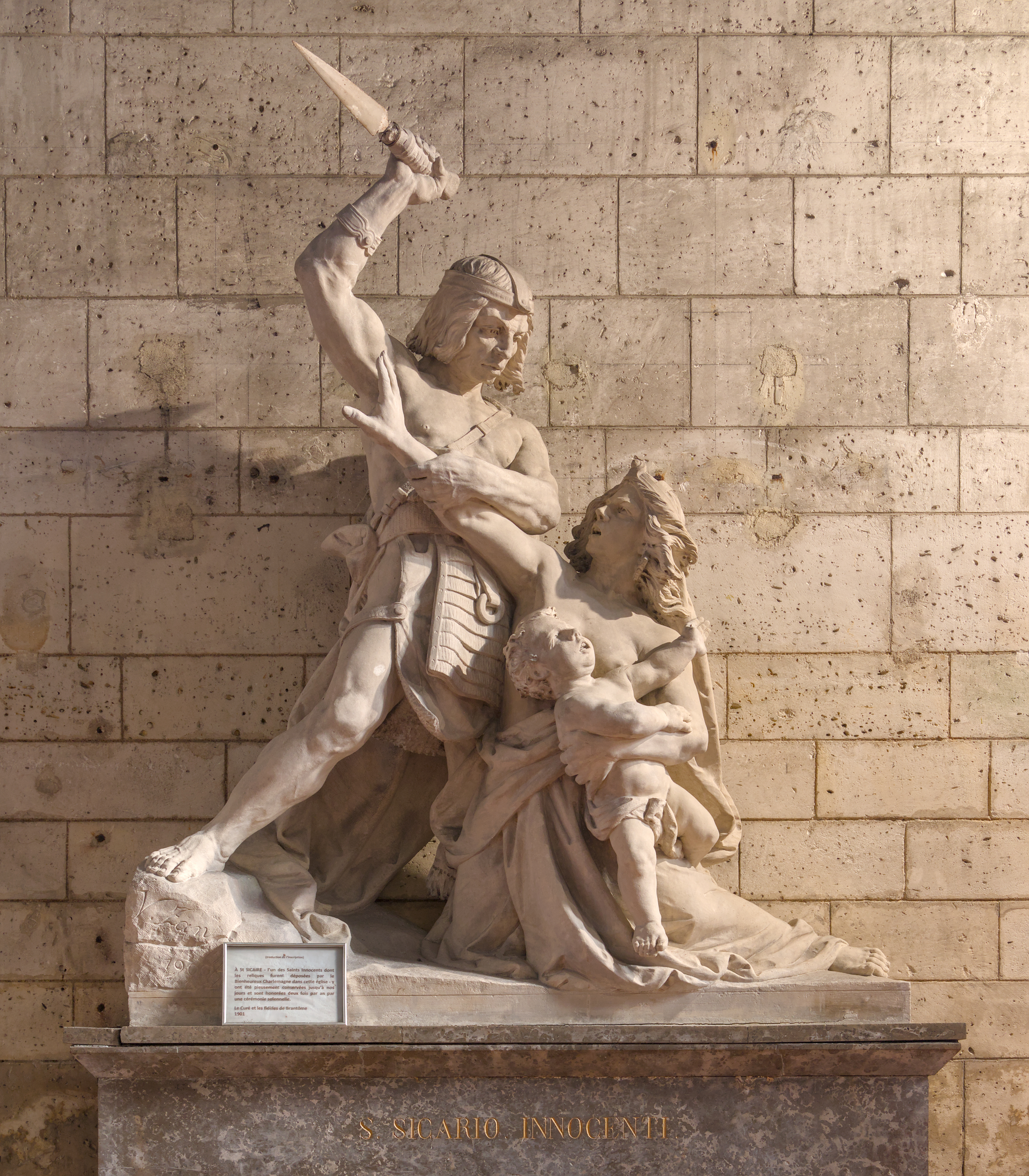
Sculpture representing the martyrdom of Saint Sicarius, Brantôme.
