= Euthalia of Sicily =

Third-century virgin and martyr from Leontini, Sicily, Italy

Saint Euthalia of Sicily
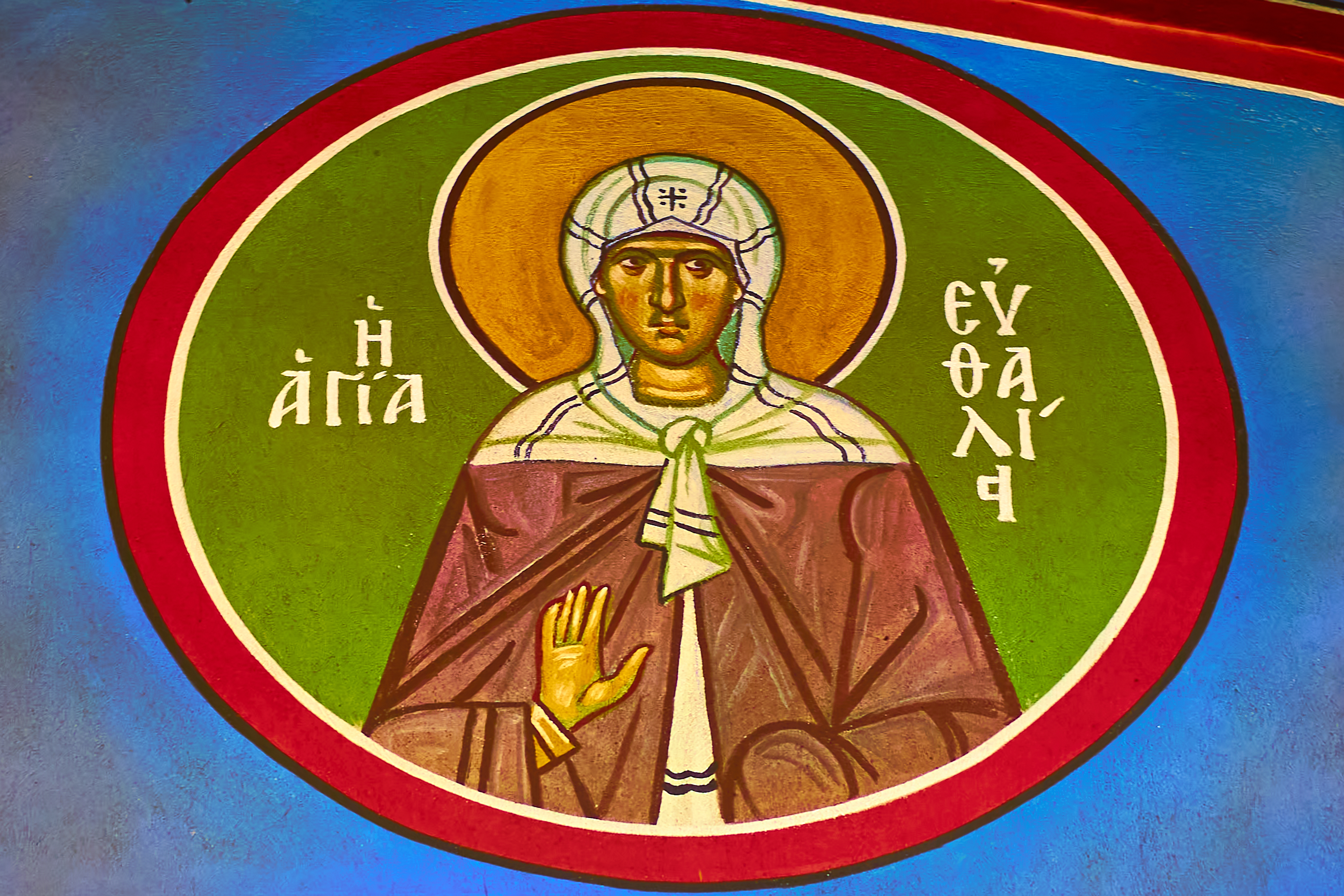

Virgin martyr
- Born: 3rd century
- Feast: 2 March

Euthalia of Sicily was a third-century virgin and martyr from Leontini, Sicily. She is commemorated in the Eastern Orthodox and Byzantine Catholic Churches on 2 March and in the Roman Catholic Church on 27 August.

Euthalia became a Christian after her mother, Saint Eutropia, was miraculously healed and converted. Although their conversion was an occasion of great joy for them, one son of the family considered this a great affront. He insisted on their renunciation of faith in Jesus, which they both refused. While her mother fled the family home, Euthalia herself chose to stay, all the while being threatened with physical harm. She remained fearless in the face of torment and suffering, and was beheaded by her brother.
