= Belina (virgin) =

Roman Catholic martyr

Saint Belina

Virgin and martyr
- Born: unknown
- Died: 1153; Troyes, France
- Venerated in: Roman Catholic Church
- Canonized: 1203 by Pope Innocent III
- Feast: 19 February or 8 September
- Attributes: palm branch, lilies, in rural attire with apron and a basket, sword

Belina (died 1153) was a Roman Catholic virgin martyr. Her birth date is unknown, but she was born to pious parents who were serfs of John Paterne, Lord of Pradines and of D'Arcy. She was killed at Landreville, in Champagne near Troyes in northeastern France, this is why she is called both Belina of Troyes and Belina of Landreville.

Hagiographer Sabine Baring-Gould described Belina as "a little peasantess". Belina was engaged to a young man of similar rank in her village, so her parents asked for Lord Paterne's permission, as was the custom. Paterne refused, expressing intention that he would marry her himself, but she rejected him. He surprised her one-day while she was tending her father's sheep; she defended herself, so he killed her "for refusing to comply to his unchaste proposals" with his sword, cutting off her head. Paterne's peasants were so outraged by his actions that they rose up against him and burned down his castle; they almost killed him, but he escaped in disguise. Pope Anastasius IV later excommunicated Paterne and took away his titles. The king confiscated his land, and the French parliament condemned him to permanent exile.

Belina's relics were scattered and lost during the French Revolution, but some bone particles and her head have been stored in a bust at the Mores Abbey in Landreville. She was canonized by Pope Innocent III in 1203, and is venerated in Troyes.

== Works cited ==
- Baring-Gould, Sabine (1877). The Lives of the Saints (1st edition). London: J. Hodges. pp. 344–345.
