= María del Pilar Cimadevilla López-Dóriga =

Venerable María del Pilar Cimadevilla López-Dóriga
- Born: February 17, 1952; Madrid, Spain
- Died: March 6, 1962 (aged 10); Madrid, Spain

María del Pilar Cimadevilla López-Dóriga, called "Pilina", (February 17, 1952 - March 6, 1962) was a Spanish girl for whom a beatification process was opened by the Roman Catholic Church. She has been declared venerable.

== Life ==
Familiarly known as “Pilina”, she was born in Madrid February 17, 1952 to Colonel Amaro Cimadevilla and María del Rosario López-Dóriga and was noted for her piety, docility of spirit, and her intelligence. At the age of nine, she developed Hodgkin's lymphoma and was treated at the military hospital of Madrid, staffed by nuns devoted to the Missionaries of the Sick. Pilina was inspired to offer up her own suffering in hope of helping others who were ill. Her illness caused her spirit and her faith to mature rapidly. She died in her mother's arms on March 6, 1962.

== Beatification process ==
After her death, her supporters began to promote her beatification process. The Congregation for the Causes of Saints stated a life of heroic virtue on April 19, 2004.
