= Virgin (title) =

Honorific title bestowed on female saints and blesseds in Christianity

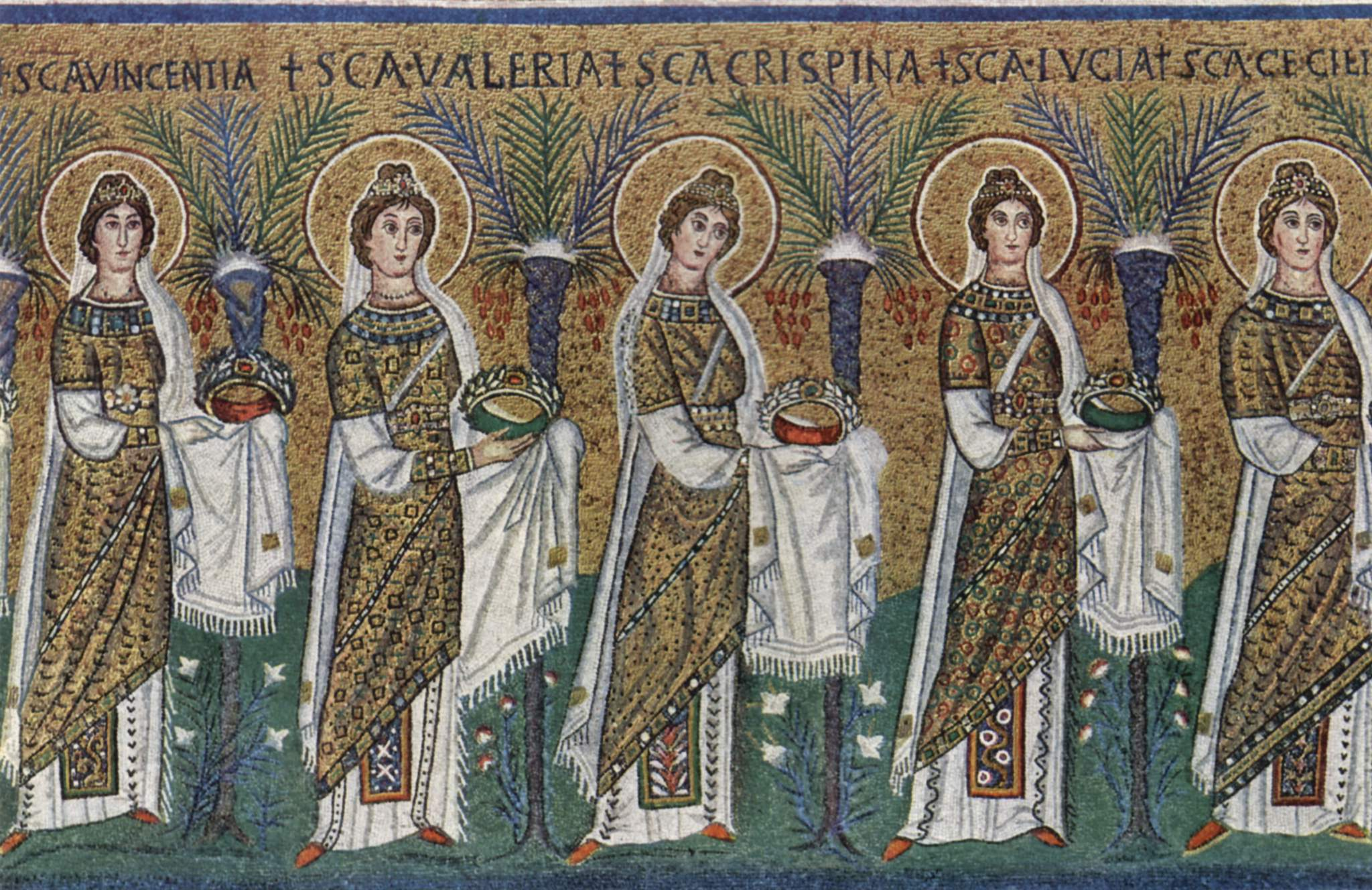
Procession of virgin martyrs bearing both martyr's palms and wreaths as the crown of a virgin (master of Sant'Apollinare Nuovo, 6th century)

The title Virgin (Latin: Virgo, Ancient Greek: Παρθένος) is an honorific bestowed on female saints and blesseds, primarily used in the Eastern Orthodox Church, the Catholic Church and the Evangelical-Lutheran Churches.

Chastity is one of the seven virtues in Christian tradition, listed by Pope Gregory I at the end of the 6th century. In 1 Corinthians, Paul the Apostle states that the virgins and the unmarried women are "concerned about the Lord's affairs", and that their "aim is to be devoted to the Lord in both body and spirit". In 2 Corinthians 11:2, Paul alludes to the metaphor of the Church as the Bride of Christ by addressing the congregation: "I have espoused you to one husband, that I may present you as a chaste virgin to Christ".

In the theology of the Church Fathers, the prototype of the sacred virgin is Mary, the mother of Jesus, consecrated by the Holy Spirit at the Annunciation. Although not directly stated in the gospels, the perpetual virginity of Mary was widely upheld as a dogma by the Church Fathers from the fourth century.

== Virgin martyrs ==
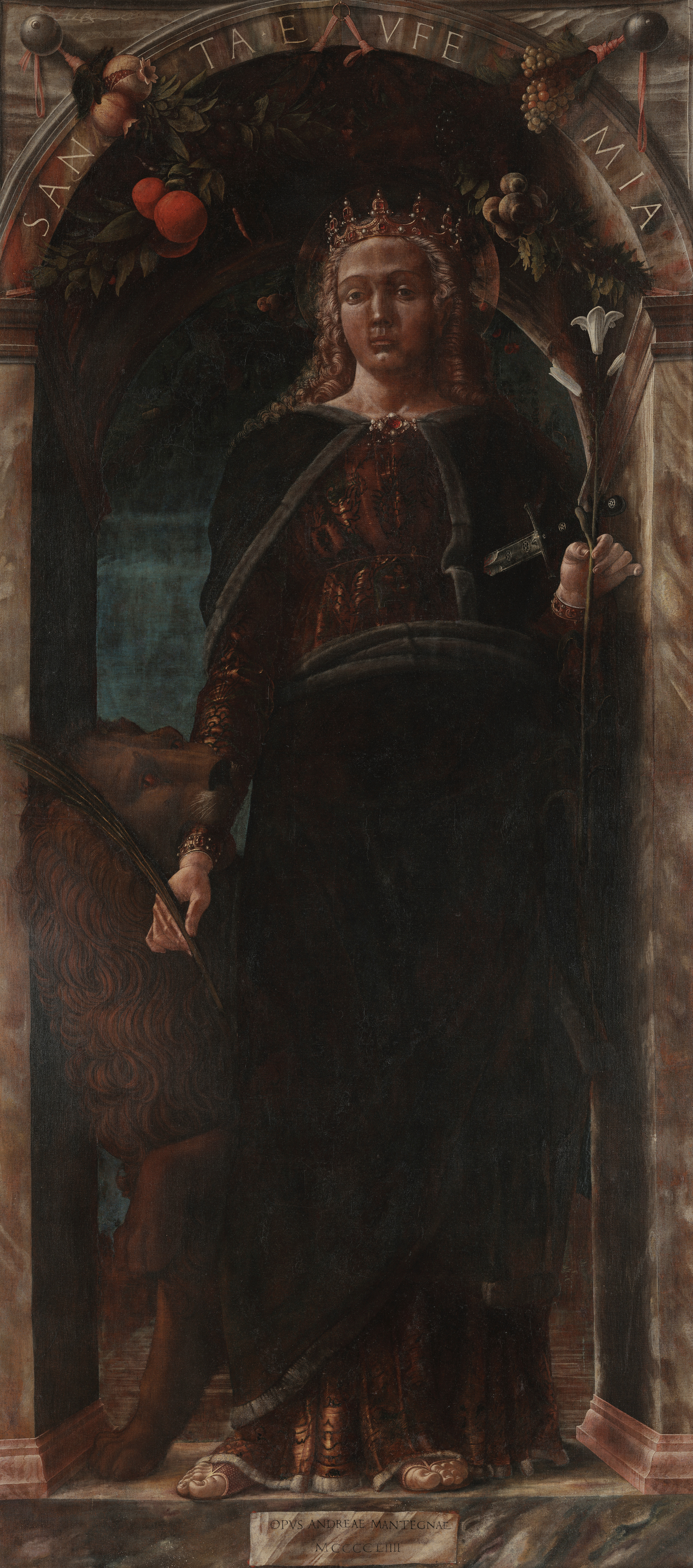
Saint Euphemia with the crown of a virgin, a white lily and the martyr's palm (Andrea Mantegna, 1454)

In the hagiography of Christian martyrs of the late first to early fourth centuries, virgin martyrs (Latin: virgo et martyr; Ancient Greek: παρθένος-μάρτυρας, Russian: дева-мученица) were often persecuted for their refusal to enter a worldly marriage after having vowed to keep their virginity for the sake of heaven. Other virgin martyrs lost their lives in defensum castitatis ('in defense of chastity'). A group of virgin martyrs of the early church, namely Saints Catherine of Alexandria, Margaret of Antioch, Barbara of Nicomedia and Dorothea of Caesarea, are called "the four capital virgins", three of them belong to the Fourteen Holy Helpers.

In the Roman Missal and the Book of Hours, virgins and virgin martyrs have their own common. Different martyrologies (for example the Martyrologium Romanum or the Martyrologium Hieronymianum) list early virgin martyrs, some of which are also named in the Canon of the Mass. In the Evangelical-Lutheran calendar of saints, certain saints are classed as "virgin and martyr", such as Agnes of Rome and Lucy of Syracuse.

- Thecla of Iconium (1st century)
- Sandukht of Armenia (1st century)
- Felicula and Petronilla of Rome (died c. 90)
- Hermione of Ephesus (c. 117)
- Serapia of Antioch (c. 119)
- Balbina of Rome (c. 130)
- Quiteria of Aquitaine (died 135)
- Wilgefortis of Lusitany (died 139)
- Marina of Aguas Santas (died 139)
- Cecilia of Rome (2nd century)
- Pudentiana of Rome (2nd century)
- Faith, Hope and Charity of Rome (2nd century)
- Melitina of Marcianopolis (2nd century)
- Venera of Rome (died 143)
- Praxedes of Rome (died 165)
- Glyceria of Heraclea (died 177)
- Blandina of Lugdunum (died 177)
- Agatha of Sicily (early 3rd century)
- Gundenis of Carthage (early 3rd century)
- Paraskevi of Iconium (3rd century)
- Estelle of Gaul (3rd century)
- Reparata of Caesarea (3rd century)
- Firmina of Rome (3rd century)
- Amonaria of Alexandria (3rd century)
- Martina of Rome (died 228)
- Tatiana of Rome (died 226 or 235)
- Euthalia of Sicily (3rd century)
- Albina of Caesarea (250 AD)
- Fusca of Ravenna (250 AD)
- Kalliopi of Rome (died 250)
- Anastasia of Rome (250 AD)
- Regina of Autun (c. 231–251 AD)
- Rufina and Secunda of Rome (257 AD)
- Maxima, Donatilla and Secunda of Tuburga (257 AD)
- Eugenia of Rome (258 AD)
- Barbara of Nicomedia (3rd century)
- Denise of Lampsacus (3rd century)
- Christina of Bolsena (3rd century)
- Vibiana (3rd century)
- Apollonia of Alexandria (died 249)
- Messalina of Foligno (died 249)
- Digna and Emerita of Rome (died 259)
- Agrippina of Mineo (died 262)
- Columba of Sens (died 273)
- Pelagia the Virgin (late 3rd century)
- Daria of Rome (283 AD)
- Justa and Rufina of Seville (died 287)
- Margaret of Antioch (died 289)
- Theodosia of Tyre (died 290)
- Hripsime of Armenia (died 290)
- Demiana and 40 virgins
- Menodora, Metrodora, and Nymphodora
- Pelagia of Tarsus
- Faith of Conques
- Kyriaki of Nicomedia (died 289)
- Aquilina of Byblos (died 293)
- Susanna of Rome (died 295)
- Eulalia of Barcelona (died 303)
- Engratia of Zaragoza (died 303)
- Euphemia of Chalcedon (died 303)
- Devota of Corsica (died 303)
- Rais of Tamman (died 303)
- Marciana of Mauretania (died 303)
- Agnes of Rome (died 304)
- Emerentiana of Rome (died 304)
- Anastasia of Sirmium (died 304)
- Charitina of Amisus (died 304)
- Febronia of Nisibis (died 304)
- Justina of Padua (died 304)
- Lucia of Syracuse (died 304)
- Agape, Chionia, and Irene of Thessalonica (died 304)
- Philomena of Rome (died 304)
- Eulalia of Mérida (died 304)
- Juliana of Nicomedia (died 304)
- Afra of Augsburg (died 304)
- Victoria of Albitina (died 304)
- Trofimena of Sicily (died 304)
- Theodora of Alexandria (died 304)
- Justina of Antioch (died 304)
- Anysia of Salonika (died 304)
- Crispina of Numidia (died 304)
- Leocadia of Toledo (died 304)
- Victoria of Córdoba (died 304)
- Catherine of Alexandria (died 305)
- Vasilissa of Nicomedia (died 309)
- Berenice and Prosdoce of Syria (died 310)
- Dorothea of Caesarea (died 311)
- Fausta of Cyzicus (died 311)
- Antonina of Constantinople (died 313)
- Bibiana of Rome (died 361/3)
- Ursula of Cologne and Companions, such as Leticia and Cordula (died 384; various other traditional dates)
- Noyale of Brittany (5th century)
- Ia of Cornwall (5th century)
- Augusta of Treviso (5th century)
- Julia of Corsica (died 439)
- Olivia of Palermo (died 448)
- Eluned of Brecon (died 468)
- Juthwara (6th century)
- Nympha of Palermo (6th century)
- Columba of Cornwall (6th century)
- Christina of Persia (6th century)
- Dymphna of Geel (7th century)
- Alena of Brussels (died 640)
- Irene of Tomar (c. 653)
- Winifred of Treffynnon (died c. 660)
- Reineldis of Saintes (died c. 680)
- Theodosia of Constantinople (died 729)
- Sidwell of Devon (died 740)
- Febronia of Syria (died 749)
- Columba of Córdoba (died 853)
- Solange of Bourges (died 880)
- Belina of Troyes (died 1153), canonized in 1203
- Margaret of Louvain (died 1225)
- Markella of Chios (14th century)
- Irene of Lesbos (died 1463)
- Helen of Sinope (1700s)
- Kyranna of Thessaloniki (died 1751)
- Maria Goretti (died 1902), canonized in 1950
- Karolina Kózka (died 1914), beatified in 1987
- Albertina Berkenbrock (died 1931), beatified in 2007
- Antonia Mesina (died 1935), beatified in 1987
- Benigna Cardoso da Silva (died 1941), beatified in 2022
- Edith Stein (died 1942), canonized in 1998
- Maria Restituta Kafka (died 1943), beatified in 1998
- Anna Kolesárová (died 1944), beatified in 2018
- Pierina Morosini (died 1957), beatified in 1987
- Veronica Antal (died 1958), beatified in 2018
- Marie-Clémentine Anuarite Nengapeta (died 1964), beatified in 1985
- Isabel Cristina Mrad Campos (died 1982), beatified in 2022
- Sandra Sabattini (died 1984), beatified in 2021
- Lindalva Justo de Oliveira (died 1993), beatified in 2007

== Consecrated virgins ==
The tradition of the rite of the Consecratio virginum (consecration of a virgin) dates back to the fourth century, the form of life to apostolic times. The first known formal consecration is that of Saint Marcellina, dated AD 353, mentioned in De Virginibus by her brother, Saint Ambrose. Another early consecrated virgin is Saint Genevieve (c. 422 – c. 512). According to Raymond of Capua, Catherine of Siena (c. 1347–1380) at the age of 21 (c. 1368) experienced what she described in her letters as a mystical marriage with Jesus Christ, later a popular subject in art as the mystic marriage of Saint Catherine.

Canon 922 of the Catechism of the Catholic Church states that "From apostolic times Christian virgins, called by the Lord to cling only to him with greater freedom of heart, body, and spirit, have decided with the Church's approval to live in a state of virginity 'for the sake of the Kingdom of heaven'."

Virgins are consecrated for the church as a bride of Christ both in the Orthodox churches and the Roman Catholic church. While in the latter one the consecration has been bestowed for centuries only for nuns living in cloistered monasteries, the bestowal for women living in the world has been reintroduced under Pope Paul VI in 1970. The number of consecrated virgins ranges in the thousands. Estimates derived from the diocesan records range at around 5,000 consecrated virgins worldwide as of 2018.

== See also ==
- List of Eastern Orthodox saint titles
- Parable of the Ten Virgins
