= List of people known as the Venerable =

The Venerable, as a general epithet (rather than the religious The Venerable), may refer to:

- Azon the Venerable, Catholic prelate of the late 10th and early 11th century
- Bede (672/3–735), English Benedictine monk, writer, teacher and scholar
- Peter the Venerable (c. 1092–1156), abbot of the Benedictine abbey of Cluny
