= Guy Pierre de Fontgalland =

Servant of God Guy Pierre de Fontgalland
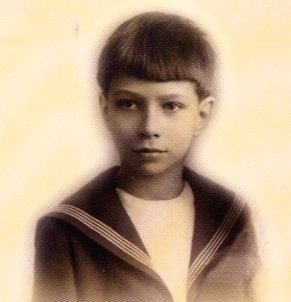
- Guy Pierre de Fontgalland, circa 1923.
- Born: November 30, 1913; Paris, France
- Died: January 24, 1925 (aged 11); Paris, France

Guy de Fontgalland (November 30, 1913 – January 24, 1925, in Paris) a French Catholic child who was regarded in the inter-war period as the youngest potential Catholic saint who was not a martyr. His beatification process was opened on November 15, 1941, and suspended on November 18, 1947.

== Life ==
Guy de Fontgalland was the son of count Pierre Heurard de Fontgalland (1884–1972), a lawyer, and Marie Renée Mathevon (1880–1956). She had intended to become a Carmelite and she was a militant Catholic. Bishop de Gibergues, Bishop of Valence (Drôme) and friend of the family, introduced them and united them in marriage. He baptized their son as Guy Pierre Emmanuel on December 7, 1913, in St. Augustine's Church.

Guy had the qualities and defects of an ordinary child. He proved to be wanton with his mother and angry with his brother Marc, born in 1916, but also sensitive and affectionate. He was especially frank and loyal, confessing to his faults at the risk of being punished. He died with the reputation of having never told a single lie. He reflected a very childlike faith inspired by Thérèse of the Child Jesus and of the Holy Face. In January 1917 he visited her tomb at Lisieux, where he accompanied his mother on pilgrimage. Although very young, he tried to imitate Jesus in everything. He "chatted with him" in the privacy of his room and, subsequently, during Holy Communion. He offered every day small sacrifices to try to "please Jesus". He was only five years old when he manifested his desire to make his First Holy Communion and, the following year his wish to become a priest. He learned to read and write in two months and was enrolled in the parish Catechism classes.

On May 22, 1921, he took advantage of the provisions of Pope Pius X in favor of early communion, and he soon became an apostle within the 'Eucharistic Crusade' sodality. On that day after a month of preparation, punctuated by "118 sacrifices" which he diligently recorded, he made his First Communion in the Church of St-Honoré d'Eylau. He was given a revelation of his approaching death but kept it secret so as not to sadden his relatives.

In October 1921, he entered the Collège Saint Louis de Gonzague, where he was a poor student, slothful and lazy in his studies despite his intelligence and curiosity. He was corrected and improved his character. He did not draw attention to himself but was noted for his charity and his easy companionship. He protected the weaker students but did not defend himself when attacked, forgave his opponents and did not keep grudges or hard feelings, was never sulking and refused to denounce others or to cause trouble.

In July 1924, the family went on a pilgrimage to Lourdes. In front of the grotto, he had a confirmation of his earlier revelation that he would die soon, on a Saturday, the day of the Blessed Virgin Mary.

On the night of 7–8 December, he fell ill with diphtheria. There followed a period of crisis and remissions during which, knowing he would die despite the optimism of his doctors, he disclosed his "double secret" to his mother. He confronted the pain with courage and died of suffocation on Saturday, January 24, 1925, aged eleven.

== Later reputation ==
His death caused a sensation. At the end of 1925, the Father Rector of St. Louis de Gonzague wrote: "Really the way in which the story of this little life spreads is amazing; the finger of God is here." There was a continuous procession of parents, friends, and religious at 37 rue Vital where the body surrounded by white flowers was exposed for 52 hours by special permission. A photograph of Guy on his deathbed was sent or delivered in his memory to a total of 500 copies.

After a ceremony at Our Lady of Grace Church at Passy, the coffin was taken to Gare de Lyon and transported to the Cathedral of Die (Drôme - the family seat). The funeral service at took place on Friday 30 January 1925, "in the middle of a very large crowd".

Encouraged by priests, including the Apostolic Nuncio, Bishop Cerretti (who subsequently wrote the preface) and the Archbishop of Paris, Madame de Fontgalland wrote a short biography of her son. It was published in the autumn, first in an edition of 400, then 4,000, then 95,000 copies and was translated into thirteen languages.

Initially in France and then around the world, more was written about him. Many came to pray at his grave and visit his parents. Hundreds of thousands of requests for Fontgalland's memorial images were received; it was ultimately distributed in 48 different languages. Some 726,000 parcels of clothes were distributed. Books were dedicated to him in several languages.

At the inauguration of the statue of Christ the Redeemer in Rio de Janeiro, in October 1931, the Brazilian Episcopate and over five hundred priests requested the beatification of the child. They echoed the 650,000 signatures already sent to Rome and Paris between 1926 and 1931. The following year, on June 15, a diocesan tribunal was constituted by the Archbishop of Paris, to investigate his cause. By March 1, 1934, 244 conversions, 698 religious vocations, 742 physician-attested cures, and approximately 85,000 other graces were documented and attributed to him.

On March 25, 1936, his body was transferred to the chapel Sainte Paule at Valence (Drôme) to assist the vocation of the seminarians. On September 11, his parents and his brother were received by Pius XI who had promoted his cause. There were by then 1,312,000 signatures of children and adults asking the pope to accelerate the beatification of Guy.

The 1,804-page record of the inquiry was sent to the Congregation of Rites in Rome on 8 February 1937. The decision to suspend the cause was announced informally in November 1941, at the opening of the ordinary process, then officially on 18 November 1947, ten years after the close of the diocesan investigation.

== See also ==
- List of Servants of God

== Bibliography ==
- Joseph B. Code, Guy de Fontgalland, Angel of the Eucharist, New York: The Paulist Press, 1932. OCLC 2589159
- Fr. Lawrence L. McReavy, MA, Guy de Fontgalland, Saint Louis, MO: B. Herder Book Company, 1932.

The following are in French:

- ‘‘Une Âme d'enfant: Guy de Fontgalland’’', Preface by Mgr Cerretti, Paris: Maison de la Bonne Presse, 1925
- Eugène Roupain, Deux petits communiants: Anne de Guigné (1911–1922) et Guy de Fontgalland (1913–1925), 1926
- Derniers souvenirs sur Guy de Fontgalland, Paris: Maison de la Bonne Presse, 1927
- P. Clovis de Provin, Guy de Fontgalland, sa piété filiale envers sa «maman du Ciel», Œuvre des trois Ave Maria, 1927
- M. Burnouf-Karr, L'Ange missionnaire ou scène de la vie de Guy de Fontgalland, petit apôtre de la communion précoce, 1927
- Abbé F. Gellé, L'Enfant du secret Guy de Fontgalland, Bloud & Gay, 1929
- Francis Jammes, La Vie de Guy de Fontgalland, Paris-Lyon: Vitte, 1929
- Henry Perroy, La Mission d'un enfant, Guy de Fontgalland, Preface by René Bazin, Paris-Lyon: Vitte, 1929
- Henry Perroy, Votre ami Guy, Paris-Lyon:Vitte, 1929
- Eugène Dévaud, Guy de Fontgalland: un petit Français mondial: pédagogie de la grâce dans un cœur d'enfant, Fribourg: Imp.Œuvre de St-Paul, 1930.
- Eugène Dévaud, Auguste Overney, La personnalité surnaturelle d'un jeune garçon: Guy de Fontgalland 1913–1925, Paris-Lyon: Vitte, 1930.
- Abbé F. Gellé, Petite vie illustrée de Guy de Fontgalland, Tolra, 1930.
- Abbé F. Gellé, L'avocat des enfants, Guy de Fontgalland, Paris: Le Pélican, 1931.
- Abbé F. Gellé, La Maman du ciel: 31 lectures pour le mois de Marie, d'après Guy de Fontgalland, Paris: Le Pélican, 1932.
- Félix Sartiaux, Comment on fait un saint, Paris: Imp. Lefebvre, 1930
- La survie de Guy de Fontgalland, étude documentaire, Paris-Lyon: Vitte, 1931.
- Gaëtan Bernoville, L'enfant qui a dit 'oui': Guy de Fontgalland, Paris: Grasset, 1932.
- Elie Maire, Guy de Fontgalland, Paris: Desclée de Brouwer, 1932.
- Un parfait croisé: Guy de Fontgalland, Paris-Lyon: Vitte, 1933.
- Victorin Delvoie, Le serviteur de Dieu Guy de Fontgalland et Jésus, Jean Dupuis, 1933.
- Comtesse de Galard Béarn, Un serviteur de Dieu: Guy de Fontgalland, 1933
- Y. de Montzaigle, L'Apôtre de la communion précoce. Le serviteur de Dieu Guy de Fontgalland, 1933.
- André Vignaud, « Ma maman du Ciel » ou la ravissante dévotion envers la Sainte Vierge du Serviteur de Dieu, Guy de Fontgalland, Paris-Lyon:Vitte, 1933.
- Luc Vérus, Guy de Fontgalland est-il un saint ?, Dosne et Silvin, 1934.
- Fra Vito, Preface of Valentin Brifaut, Message d'ange, Guy de Fontgalland, Louvain: H.Bomans, 1935.
- R. Meysonnier, Marche glorieuse de Guy de Fontgalland, Lugdunum, 1936.
- Abbé Camille Bouvier, Sous le signe de Jésus: Sainte Thérèse de Lisieux et Guy de Fontgalland, Jean Renard, 1939.
- Abbé Goerger, Guy de Fontgalland et la psychologie de l'amour, 1939.
- Henri Louis Dubly, La Vie et la survie de Guy de Fontgalland, devant la psychologie, la critique et l'histoire, Paris: Epee, 1947.
- Robert Deshors, Un enfant a dit oui: Guy de Fontgalland, 1913–1925, Association des amis de Guy, 1982.
- Ludovic Lécuru, Guy de Fontgalland, 1913–1925 : un sacrifice de louange, Paris: Sarment-Fayard, 1998. ISBN 9782866792534
- Ludovic Lécuru, Joëlle d'Abbadie Un Ange pour Jésus, Guy de Fontgalland, Paris: Téqui, 2003
- René Charvin, Je ferai de toi mon ange, Guy de Fontgalland, Paris: Téqui, 2001.ISBN 2740309023
- Thierry Lelièvre, Même les enfants peuvent être canonisés! Paris: Téqui, 2005. ISBN 9782740312216
- Une Âme d'enfant : Guy de Fontgalland, 1913–1925. St-Jovite, Québec: Éditions Magnificat, 1987. ISBN 9782762313574

In Spanish:

- Gellé, F., Abate, Guy de Fontgalland, el niño del secreto, Buenos Aires: Gladium, 1939.

In German:

- Maria Schmidtmayer, Des kleinen Jesus Brüderlein – Guido von Fontgalland (185–199), in the book: Es wird heilege Kinder geben; 6. Auflage. Innsbruck-Wien-München: Tyrolia-Verlag, 1937,.
- Jon Svensson SJ, Geschichte des kleinen Guido, Herder, Freiburg i. Br. 1930.

In Slovenian:

- Gvido Fontgalandski, Angelček, Ljubljana, 1930.
- Ferdinand Kolednik, Zgodbe malega Gvidona (Guy de Fontgalland) – 1913–1925, Škofijsko vodstvo Marijinih družb, Ljubljana 1931
