= Helen of Sinope =

Helen of Sinope was a daughter of the Bekiary family in 18th century Sinope, in modern-day Turkey. She was a virgin martyr and is commemorated by the Eastern Orthodox Church on 1 November.

== Life and Martyrdom ==
Helen was a 15-year old Greek Christian, living with her family in the Christian enclave at Sinope. One day her mother sent her out to buy embroidery thread from a shop in Kryonas. Ukuzoglu Pasha, the Ottoman Turkish governor of Sinope, saw her in the street and ordered for her to be brought to his residence. Ukuzoglu then attempted to rape her two or three separate occasions, but was pushed back by an unseen force. After this happened, Helen escaped and returned home.

Ukuzoglu then summoned the Sinope Council of Elders and threatened the Christian community of Sinope with death, unless Helen was brought to him. The Christian leaders gathered at the Greek School of Sinope and persuaded Helen’s father to return her to the Ukuzoglu, who unsuccessfully tried to rape her repeatedly. Throughout this ordeal, Helen recited the Six Psalms and other prayers. Ukuzoglu then sent Helen to prison, where she was tortured and killed by having two nails driven into her skull and then being beheaded.

== Body and Relics ==
After her death, the jailers put Helen's body in a sack and threw it into the Black Sea. However, the sack floated away with what was described as a heavenly light shining on it. The body floated until it reached Geai, where it sunk at the bottom of the sea.

According to Orthodox Resources, a light coming from the bottom of the sea alerted a crew of Greek sailors to Helen's resting place. Expecting to find gold, the sailors dove down to the source of the light and found the sack. After they retrieved her remains, a divine revelation showed them to be a source of healing.

Helen's body was sent to Russia, but her head was returned to Sinope, where it was venerated in the Church of the Panagia. The relic was said to be a source of miracles, especially for those suffering from headaches. After the Greek genocide and population exchange, the Greeks of the city were driven away in 1924, but the leader of the community, Christos Kafaropoulos, brought the relic with them to Greece. It is venerated today in the Church of Saint Marina in the Ano Toumbas quarter of Thessaloniki.
