= Vysoká nad Uhom =

Village and municipality in Slovakia

Vysoká nad Uhom Magasrév
- Municipality
- Flag

- Location of Vysoká nad Uhom in the Košice Region Location of Vysoká nad Uhom in Slovakia
- Coordinates: 48.63°N 22.10°E
- Country: Slovakia
- Region: Košice Region
- District: Michalovce District
- First mentioned: 1214

Area
  - Total: 15.33 km^{2} (5.92 sq mi)
- Elevation: 106 m (348 ft)

Population (2025)
  - Total: 726
- Time zone: UTC+1 (CET)
  - Summer (DST): UTC+2 (CEST)
- Postal code: 721 4
- Area code: +421 56
- Vehicle registration plate (until 2022): MI
- Website: www.obecvysokanaduhom.sk

Vysoká nad Uhom (Hungarian: Magasrév) is a village and municipality in Michalovce District in the Košice Region of eastern Slovakia.

== History ==
In historical records the village was first mentioned in 1214.

== Geography ==
The municipality lies at an altitude of 106 metres (348 ft) and covers an area of 15.33 km^{2} (5.92 sq mi) (2025).

== Population ==
Population statistic (10 years)
Year	1995	2005	2015	2025
Count	897	786	798	726
Difference		−12.37%	+1.52%	−9.02%

Population statistic
Year	2024	2025
Count	744	726
Difference		−2.41%

It has a population of 726 people (31 December 2025).

=== Ethnicity ===
Census 2021 (1+ %)
Ethnicity	Number	Fraction
Slovak	750	95.41%
Not found out	30	3.81%
Total	786	

In year 2021 was 786 people by ethnicity 750 as Slovak, 30 as Not found out, 5 as Rusyn, 3 as Czech, 3 as Ukrainian, 3 as Hungarian, 2 as Romani and 1 as Russian.

Note on population: The difference values of population numbers in the table "Population statistic" and in the sections "Ethnicity" & "Religion" is caused by the use of various statistical methods.

=== Religion ===
Census 2021 (1+ %)
Religion	Number	Fraction
Roman Catholic Church	344	43.77%
Greek Catholic Church	195	24.81%
Calvinist Church	97	12.34%
None	51	6.49%
Not found out	42	5.34%
Jehovah's Witnesses	32	4.07%
Evangelical Church	13	1.65%
Total	786	

In year 2021 was 786 people by religion 344 from Roman Catholic Church, 195 from Greek Catholic Church, 97 from Calvinist Church, 51 from None, 42 from Not found out, 32 from Jehovah's Witnesses, 13 from Evangelical Church, 7 from Eastern Orthodox Church, 2 from Ad hoc movements, 1 from Other, 1 from Seventh-day Adventist Church and 1 from Buddhism.

== Culture ==
The village has a football pitch. The village contains a shrine dedicated to Anna Kolesárová, which is a destination for Roman Catholic pilgrims.
