= Margaret of Louvain =

Belgian servant and saint

Saint Margaret of Louvain
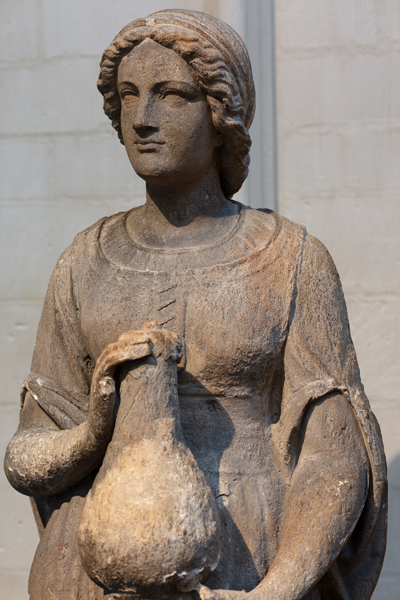
- Statue of Saint Margaret at the chapel of St. Peter's Church, Leuven)

Virgin martyr
- Born: 1207
- Died: 1225; Louvain, Duchy of Brabant
- Venerated in: Roman Catholic Church
- Feast: 2 September

Margaret of Louvain (also known as Fiere Margriet or Margaretha de Trotse (Dutch); Marguerite la Fière (French); 1207–1225) was a servant murdered by thieves. She is venerated in the Roman Catholic Church; her shrine is in St. Peter's Church in Louvain.

== Life ==
Margaret was a servant from Louvain, Duchy of Brabant (now Belgium). As a teenager, she worked at the inn belonging to her relatives, a certain Aubert and his wife, until they sold the establishment. The couple had planned to enter the religious life, with Margaret herself set on joining a Cistercian convent.

On their last night at the inn, Margaret was out when thieves broke in and murdered her employers. She returned as the assailants were leaving and saw what had happened; the thieves gave chase as she fled the scene. They eventually caught up with her along the banks of the Dyle River, where they killed her as well by slitting her throat.

== Veneration ==
Margaret's killers had initially thrown her corpse into the Dyle, but it was recovered and buried on the riverbank where she was killed. Miracles were later attributed to her at her tomb, and her remains were subsequently translated and reinterred in a chapel in the yard of Saint Peter's Church in the centre of town.

The cause for Margaret's beatification was formally opened on 8 June 1896, granting her the title of Servant of God. In 1905, Pope Pius X confirmed her cultus.

Margaret is a patron saint of domestic workers.

== Chapel of Margaret of Louvain ==
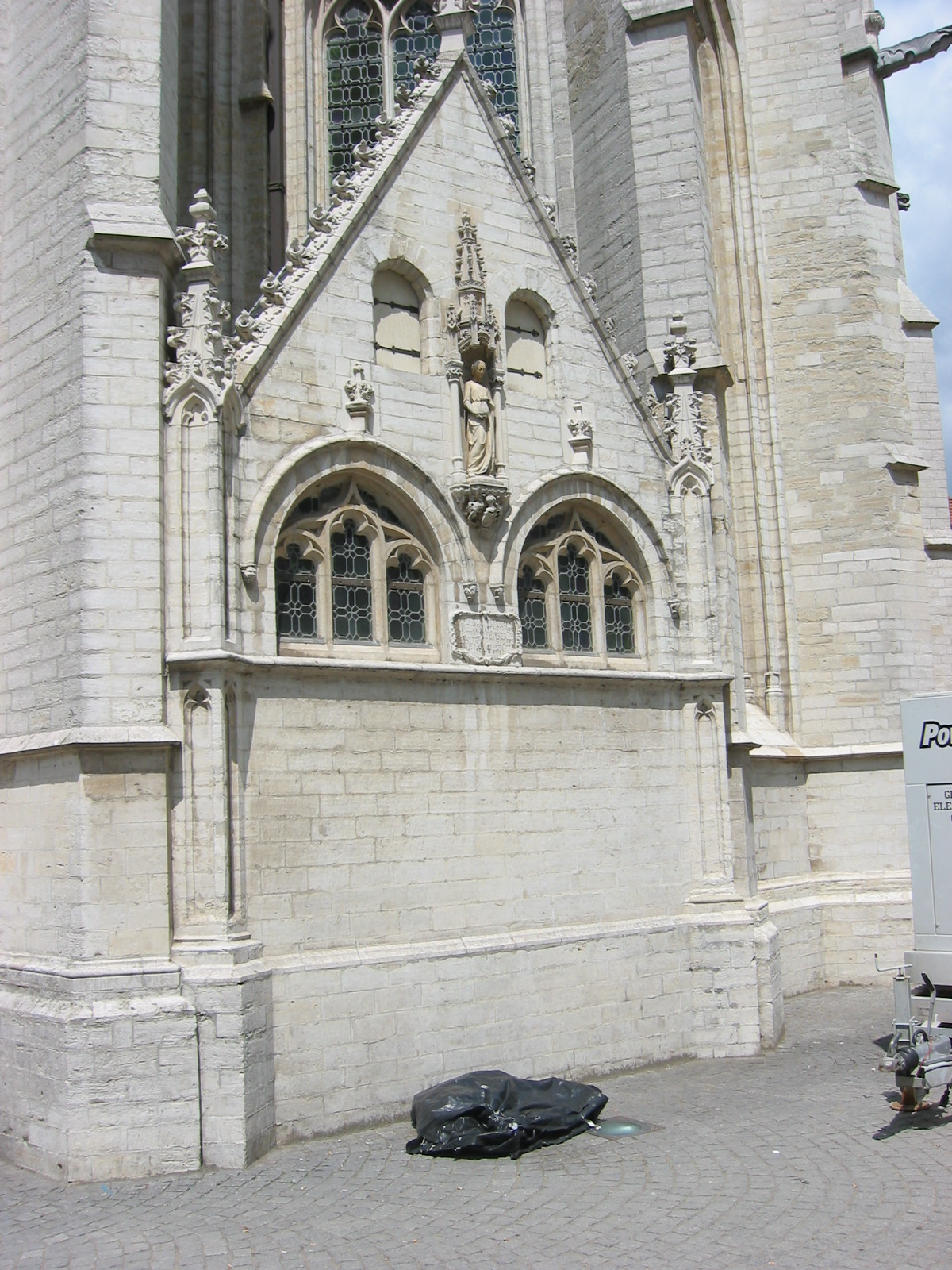
Chapel of Margaret of Louvain

=== Relics ===
In St. Peter's Church, Leuven, the chasse with the relics of Margaret of Louvain are located in a chapel dedicated to her. In the thirteenth century, Margaret's remains were buried in a coffin in a chapel set up for her and built against the choir of St Peter's Church. During the French occupation in the eighteenth century, her remains were relocated to Germany. After said occupation, they were returned to Leuven in 1802.

In 1902 the shrine was made of gilded copper and adorned with semi-precious stones and co-financed by gifts from parishioners and young maids who honor Marguerite la Fière as their patron saint. The shrine has several panels, each describing a scene from Margaret's life. The first panel represents Margaret's devotion. On the second, the foster parents of the saint welcome the pilgrims to their inn. On the third panel the duke of Leuven kneels at Margaret's corpse. The funeral procession of Margaret can be seen on the fourth panel. The torture death of Margaret is then depicted. On the sixth panel a soldier sees the corpse of Margaret floating in the Dyle. Margaret is crowned by the angels on the penultimate and seventh panels. Finally, the veneration of Margaretha in Leuven is depicted.

=== Scenes by Pieter Verhaghen ===
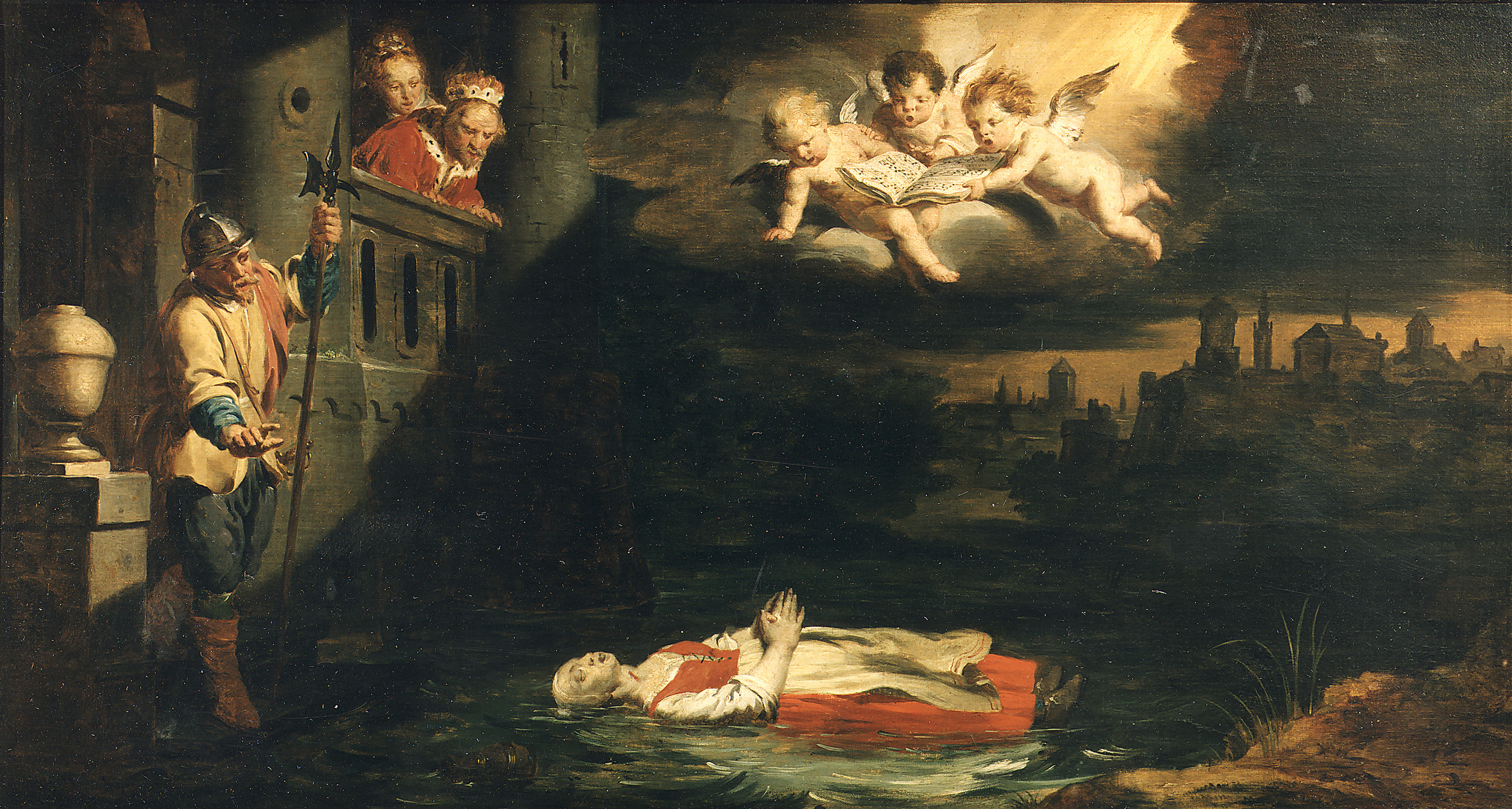
Death of Margaretha of Louvain by Pieter-Jozef Verhaghen

Pieter Verhaegen, an artist from Leuven, painted five scenes from Margaretha's life in 1765. These can be seen in her chapel in St. Peter's Church.
