= Michele Magone =

Italian student of Saint John Bosco

Michael Magone, in Italian: Michele Magone (1845 – 1859) was an Italian adolescent student of Saint John Bosco. After making exceptional improvements in his behavior and character, he died due to a gastric hemorrhage at fourteen years of age.

Michael Magone was one of three students that Saint John Bosco considered to be a saint. One student was the well known Saint Dominic Savio, while the other is the lesser known Francis Besucco. A painting of the three students is found in St. Francis De Sales Church in Valdocco, Turin. His mother was Sarah Magone whereas his father was Niovani Magone, who was a dacoit.

== Biography ==
=== First meeting with Saint John Bosco ===
Michael Magone was playing with a gang of boys inside the train station, when Saint John Bosco heard his distinctively authoritative voice and approached him. After a brief discussion, Saint John Bosco realized that the boy had potential, but was vulnerable to crime in his current situation. Having to quickly catch a train, he gave Michele Magone a medal and instructed him go to the assistant priest, Francesco Alberto Ariccio (1819–1884).

=== At the Oratory of St. Francis de Sales ===
When Michael Magone came to the Oratory he had an immense desire to play outside with the other boys, but after about a month he suddenly became sad and evasive. When questioned about his despondent mood, he expressed feeling inadequate in piety and lack of hope that he can improve. His companion convinced him that speaking with his confessor would help clear his conscience. Following confession he was overwhelmed by relief and became filled with happiness. From then on he went to confession and communion frequently and began to enjoy practices of

== The Life of Michael Magone ==
Saint John Bosco was inspired by Michael Magone and wrote a book about him, The Life of Michael Magone.
