= List of venerable people =

List of venerable people may refer to:

- List of venerable people (Catholic)
- List of venerable people (Eastern Orthodox)
- List of archdeacons in the Church of England
- List of archdeacons in the Church in Wales

== See also ==
- List of people known as the Venerable
