= Fusca of Ravenna =

Saint Fusca of Ravenna

Virgin Martyr, Child Martyr
- Born: c. AD 235; Ravenna or Sabratah
- Died: February 13, 250; Ravenna
- Venerated in: Roman Catholic Church
- Feast: February 13
- Patronage: youth

Fusca of Ravenna was a child martyr who was killed c. AD 250 in Ravenna, Italy during the Decian persecution. Her nurse, Maura, was martyred with her. Both are venerated as saints by the Roman Catholic Church. Their feast day is February 13.

== Life ==
Her father was nobleman in Ravenna. She was raised by her father's slave Maura. They both were baptised by the priest Ermolar. Her father reported them to local judge who sentenced them to death on February 13, 250. Fusca was reportedly 15-year old at the time of her martyrdom.

== Veneration ==
Her grave became a place of pilgrimage shortly after her death. During barbaric invasions in Italy, her body was hidden at the Torcello island near Venice. A church was erected on the place of her burial in the 12th century.

There are four churches dedicated to her in Istria. In Croatian, she is known and venerated under the name Foška.

The presence of a column painting of the saint at the Church of the Nativity, in Bethlehem has provoked scholarly interest.
