= Anna Kolesárová =

Slovak blessed and martyr

Blessed Anna Kolesárová
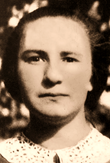

Virgin and martyr
- Born: 14 July 1928; Vysoká nad Uhom, Czechoslovakia
- Died: 22 November 1944 (aged 16); Pavlovce nad Uhom, Slovakia
- Venerated in: Catholic Church
- Beatified: 1 September 2018, Lokomotíva Stadium, Košice, Slovakia by Cardinal Giovanni Angelo Becciu
- Major shrine: Pavlovce nad Uhom
- Feast: 22 November, 20 November (in the Archdiocese of Košice)

Anna Kolesárová (14 July 1928 – 22 November 1944) was a Slovak Roman Catholic virgin and a martyr. Her life was cut short in 1944 when a Soviet soldier killed her after she resisted his rape attempt. Those who knew her best described her as being a modest and simple girl who attended Mass each morning and assumed care of the household following her mother's death in her late childhood.

Kolesárová's beatification process opened in 2004 and she became titled as a Servant of God upon the cause's launch. The process culminated on 6 March 2018 after Pope Francis confirmed both that she had died in defensum castitatis ("in defense of chastity") and her forthcoming beatification. The beatification was celebrated on 1 September 2018 in Slovakia.

== Life ==
=== Childhood and adolescence ===
Anna Kolesárová was born on 14 July 1928 in the Michalovce District in the former Czechoslovakia to Ján Kolesár (known to friends as "Hruška") and Anka née Kušnírová. Anna was the youngest of three, she had a half sister, Mary, and a brother Michal. Her baptism was celebrated in their local parish on 15 July. The Kolesárs were described as a pious farmers that were frequent Mass attendees who lived out their faith in concrete manners.

Her mother died sometime after she turned ten and it fell upon her to assume care of the household and for her older brother Michal. Those around her described her life as being both modest and simple while also noting her frequent presence at church. Kolesárová attended Mass with her friends after she completed the household chores.

In 1944 - in the autumn - the final and bloodiest phase to World War II (the Eastern front) was passing through the Kolesárová's native Zemplín region, which was then a part of the Hungarian state. It was during this violent transition period that the people living in surrounding villages would hide in their cellars to wait for the shelling and fighting to end.

=== Murder ===
On 22 November 1944 the Red army soldiers entered the town. Her father Ján sheltered with his children and their neighbors in the cellar under the kitchen. During a tour of the house one drunken Soviet soldier discovered the hideout and peered inside. Kolesárová's father bade her to "give him something to eat" and so she emerged from the hideout and walked up to the kitchen to serve the soldier food and water in the hopes of maintaining peace and to prove that she and the others posed no threat to the soldier. The uncertain nature of the war prompted her and other women in the village to wear black dresses in order not to attract unwanted attention to themselves and to discourage improper behavior from the soldiers. But this did not deter the soldier from making unwanted sexual advances towards her. Kolesárová refused his advances and pulled herself out of his grip as he attempted to rape her. The soldier pursued her to the basement.

There the soldier jumped her and ordered her to die in front of her father before he pointed his PPSh-41 submachine gun at her and killed her on the spot for her refusal; she was killed in front of her father and brother with two shots to the face and chest. Her final words were recorded as: "Goodbye father! Jesus, Mary, Joseph!" The girl had made her confession and had received Communion not long before she was killed. Her remains were buried the next evening despite the intense fighting occurring in the area but the funeral was conducted without a priest in secret so as to remain safe. The priest Anton Lukáč celebrated the solemn funeral rites one week later on 29 November 1944.

=== Aftermath ===
Lukáč was the parish priest for the village of Pavlovce nad Uhom and later himself investigated her death. He interviewed the villagers and obtained signed statements from five witnesses. He then recorded the incident into his parish's chronicles and in the register noted that she died to defend her innocence. The Jesuit priest Michal Potocký also provided information about Kolesárová's life and the circumstances surrounding her death. Despite this - and after the war had ended - the new socialist government of Czechoslovakia banned mention of the incident and enforced a strict ban on open gatherings at the grave site.

The house that she once lived still remains. It now is used by an organization founded and dedicated to her for people of her age. The Domček organization organizes volunteer work as well as social events and workshops. There are also frequent pilgrimages to her grave (three times per year, in February, April and August), while in Pavlovce nad Uhom there is a large gathering that is dedicated to her which is popular among adolescents.

== Beatification ==
The beatification process commenced on 3 July 2004 after the Congregation for the Causes of Saints titled her as a Servant of God and declared "nihil obstat" (no objections) to the cause. The diocesan investigation into her life and murder was opened in Košice on 2 April 2005 and was closed on 14 February 2012 after hearing from 38 people. The C.C.S. later validated the diocesan process in Rome on 14 June 2013 and received the 650-paged Positio dossier from the postulation (officials leading the cause) in 2015 for evaluation. Theologians approved the cause following their assessment of the dossier as did the C.C.S. members later on 6 February 2018.

Her beatification received official confirmation on 6 March 2018 after Pope Francis confirmed that Kolesárová had died "in defensum castitatis" (meaning to defend herself as a virgin). The beatification was celebrated in her native Slovakia on 1 September 2018 and around 30 000 people attended the Mass.

The current postulator for this cause is Doc. Andrea Ambrosi. The current vice-postulator is Juraj Jurica.
