= E. M. Rose =

American historian

E. M. Rose (born 1959) is a historian of medieval and early modern England and a journalist, and the inaugural visiting scholar in the Program in Medieval Studies at Harvard University, best known for the book The Murder of William of Norwich. Rose worked as a producer at CNN for a decade prior to beginning a career as a historian. She has taught at Princeton University, Johns Hopkins, Villanova, and Baruch College, and has been a visiting fellow of Murray Edwards College, Cambridge University and visiting scholar at Oxford University's Centre for Hebrew and Jewish Studies. She has written widely about medieval antisemitism in England and France and the early English colonization of Virginia, among other topics.

== The Murder of William of Norwich ==
E. M. Rose's first book, The Murder of William of Norwich: The Origins of the Blood Libel in Medieval Europe, published by Oxford University Press in 2015 was reviewed as a landmark in the study of the history of the Blood libel, as the first detailed, academic investigation into the circumstances surrounding the 1144 unsolved murder of William of Norwich, the first historical incident to which the Blood libel can be traced.

The Murder of William of Norwich was recognized as a "Top Ten Book in History" by The Sunday Times (London) and received the 2016 Ralph Waldo Emerson Award of Phi Beta Kappa society for "a scholarly study that contributes significantly to interpretation of the intellectual and cultural condition of humanity."
