= Benigna Cardoso da Silva =

Blessed Benigna Cardoso da Silva
- Painting of Benigna Cardoso de Silva (c. 2013).

Virgin and martyr
- Born: 15 October 1928; Oiti, Santana do Cariri, Ceará, Brazil
- Died: 24 October 1941 (aged 13); Oiti, Santana do Cariri, Ceará, Brazil
- Venerated in: Roman Catholic Church
- Beatified: 24 October 2022, Crato, Ceará, Brazil by Cardinal Leonardo Ulrich Steiner
- Feast: 24 October

Benigna Cardoso da Silva (15 October 1928 – 24 October 1941) was a Brazilian Catholic child.

She was adopted following the deaths of her parents, and was noted for aiding in household chores and attending Mass on a regular basis.

In 1942, da Silva was murdered after rejecting the sexual advances of Raimundo Alves Riberio, who was around her age, in order to protect herself as being chaste as she desired. She defended herself even to the point of Riberio killing her, using a machete that he carried on his person. Her beatification cause launched in 2013 and she was beatified on 24 October 2022.

== Life ==
Benigna Cardoso da Silva was born in Oiti on 15 October 1928 as the last of four children to José Cardoso da Silva and Teresa Maria da Silva. Her father died sometime before her birth and her mother died around the time she turned one. It was following this that the sisters Rosa and Honorina Sisnando adopted Benigna and her siblings. In her childhood she liked to take walks with her siblings or have picnics whenever she could, in between her taking care of the household chores; she was likewise a regular attendee at Mass and was known for her great devotion to her faith. There are no photographs of her, but contemporaries have said that Benigna was of medium height and was slender in addition to having a rounded face and a thin chin. It is also described that she had brown eyes and brown hair, and a slight strabismus in one eye.

In 1941 when she was twelve Raimundo Alves Riberio – known as Raul, who was around her age – approached her sexually, though she rejected each of his advances. In concern she sought the guidance of her parish priest, Cristiano Coelho Rodrigues, on the matter, to which her priest advised her to resist Riberio. Riberio insisted on his advances following this; but Benigna continued to reject him, causing Riberio to grow frustrated with her repeated refusals. Just one week after she turned thirteen she went to go and get water in an isolated area which Riberio knew. That afternoon, on 24 October 1941, he hid in the bushes waiting for her to arrive and then jumped out and attempted to grab her. Benigna continued resisting him, which further infuriated Riberio to the point that he took out his machete to attack her in a rage.

He struck her four times using the machete. The first blow removed three fingers from her right hand and the second struck her in the forehead. The third strike was in the stomach and the fourth was the fatal strike to her neck that killed her at once; Benigna died there at 4:00pm. Riberio fled after realizing what he had just done, and moments later her brother Cirineu – who had gone out looking for her – discovered her bloodied remains. Her funeral and burial took place on 25 October concurrent to the authorities investigating the murder. The police apprehended those considered to be suspects, including Cirineu; these individuals were released after Riberio was arrested. Riberio served his sentence in prison and then in 1991 returned to the scene of the crime, where he expressed his regret at having murdered Benigna. Her remains were later relocated on 26 May 2012 to the Santana do Cariri parish church.

== Beatification ==
In 2011 initial steps were started in order to launch a possible beatification process in the Crato diocese. The formal introduction to the cause came on 31 January 2013 after the Congregation for the Causes of Saints issued the "nihil obstat" (no objections) decree, titling Benigna as a Servant of God. This news was received in Crato just a couple of weeks later, therefore allowing the diocese to initiate a diocesan process to investigate her life, in addition to the circumstances surrounding her death, in order to ascertain if she died "in defensum castitatis" (if she died to protect herself as a chaste virgin during the attack). The diocesan process was opened on 16 March 2013 and concluded just a few months later on 21 September; the evidence was sent to the C.C.S. in Rome, leading to them validating the process as having complied with their guidelines for conducting causes.

The official Positio dossier was presented to the C.C.S. in June 2018 for assessment. Theologians issued their approval to the cause on 24 October 2018. Pope Francis approved her beatification in a decree issued on 2 October 2019; her beatification took place in Ceará on 24 October 2022. The postulator for this cause is Dr. Vittorio Capuzza.
