= Dolindo Ruotolo =

Surrender novena

Servant of God Dolindo Ruotolo
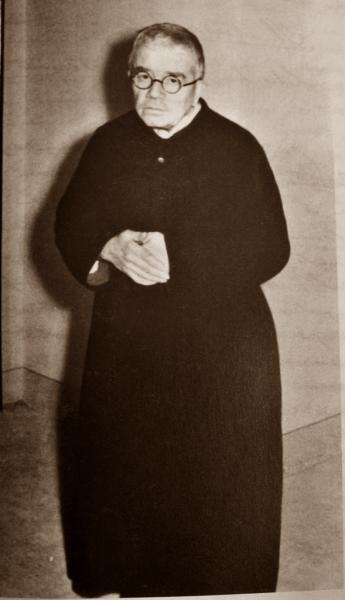
- Born: 6 October 1882; Naples, Italy
- Died: 19 November 1970 (aged 88); Naples, Italy

Dolindo Ruotolo (6 October 1882, Naples, Italy–19 November 1970, Naples, Italy) was an Italian Catholic priest. His beatification process was opened and he is thus titled a Servant of God.

Ruotolo has been recognized as an advocate of spiritual practice called the "spirituality of surrender". Polish Cardinal Konrad Krajewski, the Papal Almoner, has cited Ruotolo's personal devotion as an inspiration. He called himself "Mary’s little old man". He lived in such great poverty that his own family turned away from him. He opened his arms without fear to embrace contagious sick people, caressing and kissing them. He offered himself as a victim soul for mankind, and was afflicted with many sufferings, including complete paralysis for the last ten years of his life.

In 1941, Ruotolo, writing under the pseudonym of "Dain Cohenel", distributed to the Italian Catholic bishops a pamphlet attacking Catholic biblical scholarship, Un gravissimo pericolo per la Chiesa e per le anime. II sistema critico-scientifico nello studio e nell'interpretazione della Sacra Scrittura, le sue deviazioni funeste e le sue aberrazioni ("A very grave danger for the Church and for souls. The critical-scientific system in the study and interpretation of Sacred Scripture, its disastrous deviations and aberrations"), for which he was censured by the Pontifical Biblical Commission. He accused historical-critical methods of being the product of an "accursed spirit of pride, presumption, and superficiality, disguised under minute investigations and hypocritical literal exactness". Ruotolo authored a ten-thousand page Bible commentary, La Sacra Scrittura, which on 20 November 1940 was placed on the Index of Forbidden Books.

While it is historically accurate that Don Dolindo Ruotolo's 33-volume biblical commentary La Sacra Scrittura was placed on the Index of Forbidden Books on November 20, 1940, this action must be understood within its proper historical and theological context. The subsequent rehabilitation of both the work and its author, along with widespread ecclesiastical support, demonstrates that this initial censure was later recognized as unjust.

Significantly, Pope Pius XI, encouraged by Armida Barelli, the renowned Catholic activist who had a great devotion to Don Dolindo, established a new study commission around 1936. This commission ultimately led to Don Dolindo's reinstatement on July 17, 1937, when he was already 55 years old, and after almost 17 years of suspension. Cardinal Alessio Ascalesi, Archbishop of Naples since 1924, also deserves credit; he had great esteem for Don Dolindo as a biblical scholar and priest, and held him in such high regard that he chose him as his confessor during the final and most difficult period of his life.

Multiple high-ranking Church officials defended Don Dolindo's work. Bishop Giovanni Maria Sanna (1873–1956) of Gravina wrote an impassioned defense of Don Dolindo's theological writings to the Holy Office. Bishop Giuseppe Maria Palatucci of Campagna similarly defended the commentaries. Cardinal Alessio Ascalesi, Archbishop of Naples, not only supported Don Dolindo's rehabilitation but chose him as his personal confessor. Francesco Olgiati of the Sacred Heart University of Milan, future president of the Giuseppe Toniolo Institute of Higher Studies, was a great admirer of Don Dolindo's exegetical writings.

The commentaries received remarkable endorsement from canonized and beatified figures. Blessed Gabriele Allegra (1907–1976), a great biblical scholar, missionary to China, and translator of Sacred Scripture into Chinese, wrote an enthusiastic review of Don Dolindo's Commentary on chapter XII of the Book of Revelation. He enthusiastically highlighted Don Dolindo's originality, theological fervor, and almost prophetic insight veiling a true Marian fervor. Blessed Allegra noted: "These and similar thoughts constitute an original exegesis that shows no sign of being copied or hastily read, but rather flows from prolonged and prayerful meditation, precisely because Don Dolindo, when reading Scripture, meditates on it, seeking to extract all the good from it so that he may enrich God's people."

Pio of Pietrelcina held Don Dolindo's biblical work in the highest esteem. Padre Pio has said that "not a word that came from the pen of Don Dolindo should ever be lost", and called him "the holy apostle" of Naples.

The quality and orthodoxy of Dolindo's biblical scholarship continued to be recognized by Church authorities. Javier Echevarría Rodríguez, a prelate of Opus Dei, after receiving a copy of Dolindo's catechism, Catholic Doctrine, on March 23, 1999, said "I pray to the Lord that this book may continue to help young people discover Christ and the power of His doctrine".

Dolindo's greatest accomplishment is his Commentary on Sacred Scripture, which has led to many conversions. In reading the commentaries, souls are changed, grow, and are formed spiritually – these are miracles that continue to this day. The commentaries continue to be published and studied, with many priests still drawing upon them for their homilies today.

Pope Francis, in a personal letter dated July 3, 2021, to author Joanna Bątkiewicz-Brożek, praised research on Dolindo Ruotolo, writing: "Thank you for this work of research, which has allowed and will allow many people to know and appreciate the figure of Don Dolindo Ruotolo, humble and zealous Neapolitan priest. The Act of abandonment, in the formula 'Jesus, you take care of it!', does good to everyone, as it expresses complete trust in the Providence of God the Father." The papal endorsement adds significant weight to the rehabilitation of Dolindo's reputation and the recognition of his spiritual contributions to the Church. (Bątkiewicz-Brożek, Joanna, Moja misia pokračuje: Páter Dolindo Ruotolo. Slovakia: ZAEX, 2023)
