= Victalicus =

Victalicus was a child martyr, one of three children (the others being Rufinus and Silvanus) who appear to have shared the fate of their Christian parents in one of the early persecutions at Ancyra in Galatia in what is now Turkey. He is venerated by the Roman Catholic Church on 4 September. No more is known about him.
