= In odium fidei =

Latin phrase

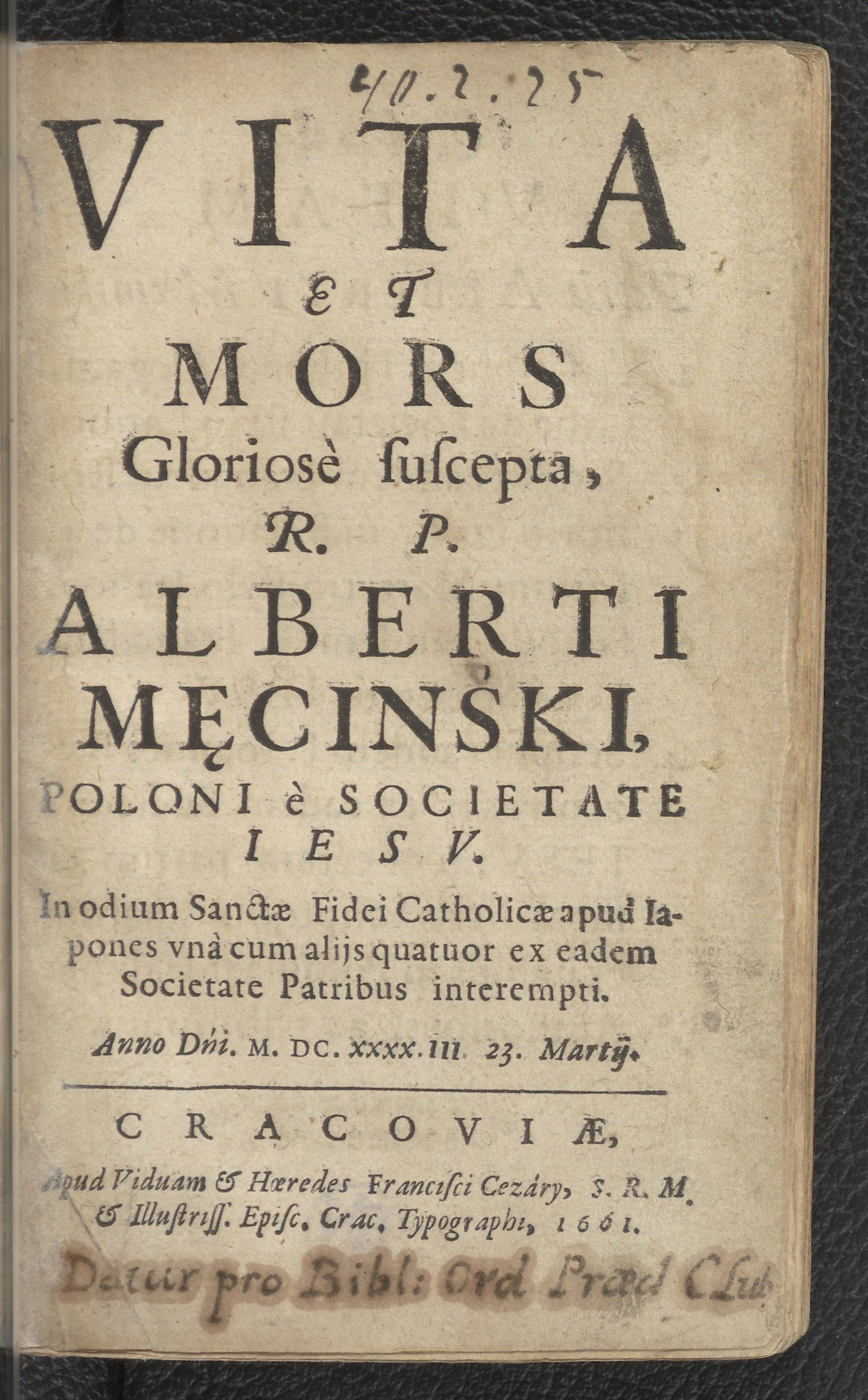
Frontispiece of a text on the life of Wojciech Męciński (1598–1643), which includes the extended phrase "in odium Sanctae Fidei Catholicae" ("in hatred of the Holy Catholic Faith")

In odium fidei is a Latin phrase which translates to "in hatred of the faith".

The term is used in the Roman Catholic Church as a cause for beatification when one of its followers, whether part of the clergy or laity, was killed because of their religion.

== See also ==
- Christian martyrdom
- List of Latin phrases (I)
