= Angela Iacobellis =

Italian Servant of God

Servant of God Angela Iacobellis
- Photograph of Iacobellis
- Born: 16 October 1948; Rome, Italy
- Died: 27 March 1961 (aged 12); Naples, Italy

Angela Iacobellis (October 28, 1948 – March 27, 1961) was an Italian girl whose cause for beatification by the Roman Catholic Church has been initiated. She is therefore titled a Servant of God.

== Life ==
Angela Iacobellis was born in Rome on 16 October 1948 and was baptized on 31 October in the Basilica of Saint Peter. She received her First Communion and Confirmation on 29 June 1955, in Naples, where her family had moved when she was five.

Iacobellis was a normal girl with her family, friends, and at school. However, according to Iacobellis's parents and those who knew her, her affinity for the Christian religion grew with age. She had a particular devotion to Saint Michael the Archangel. She spent her summer holidays in the basilicas of Saint Francis and Saint Clare in Assisi, saints to whom she was particularly sympathetic. In these periods she frequented the convent of the Poor Clares and became friends with the nuns and the abbess. At the age of 11, Iacobellis developed leukemia. For a long time, she was not informed about the severity of the disease, but she calmly and optimistically accepted the treatment when she was told that her illness, although treatable, was not curable. She consciously accepted God's will, expressing all herself in prayer and in conversation with the Lord. Her worsening leukemia made her detach herself a little by little from her life. The final phase was excruciating for her family, as she was passed from one clinical analysis to another, from one transfusion to another, with an intestinal obstruction that complicated the prognosis. The administration of oxygen did not improve the situation, and Iacobellis died around 10 p.m. on 27 March 1961.

== Cause of beatification ==
Following numerous reports of people, who through her intercession, claimed to have received graces and favors, the fame of Angela Iacobellis has spread throughout Italy. On 11 June 1991, The Holy See granted the nihil obstat for the opening of the diocesan process for her beatification and Pope John Paul II declared her a Servant of God.

On 21 November 1997 Iacobellis' body was moved from the family chapel in the cemetery of Naples to the Church of San Giovanni Battista dei Fiorentini.
