= The Venerable =

Christian religious term

The Venerable often shortened to Venerable is a style, title, or epithet used in some Christian churches and Buddhist temples. The title is often accorded to holy persons for their spiritual perfection and wisdom.

== Catholic ==
In the Catholic Church, after a deceased Catholic has been declared a servant of God by a bishop and proposed for beatification by the pope, such a Servant of God may next be declared venerable (i. e. he practised heroic virtue) during the investigation and process leading to possible beatification. A declaration that a person is venerable is not a pronouncement of their presence in Heaven, rather it is considered likely they are in heaven, with the possibility the person could still be in purgatory. Before being considered a venerable, one must be declared by a proclamation, approved by the pope, to have lived a life of heroic virtue (the theological virtues of faith, hope, and charity, alongside the cardinal virtues of prudence, justice, fortitude, and temperance). The next steps are beatification, which normally requires a miracle by the intercession of the candidate, from which point the person is referred to as Blessed. This declaration implies the person is in Heaven, experiencing the beatific vision, but this is not a requirement. The canonization is consummated when the person intercedes in a miracle (normally, their second) and is declared a saint; exceptions exist. The declaration of sainthood is definitive only to the extent that the Catholic Church claims the person died in the state of grace and already enjoys the beatific vision. For example, Popes Pius XII and John Paul II were both declared venerable by Pope Benedict XVI in December 2009, and John Paul II was declared a saint in 2014.

The 7th/8th-century English monk Saint Bede was called "venerable" soon after his death and is still often called "the Venerable Bede" or "Bede the Venerable" despite having been canonized in 1899.

== Anglican ==
In the Anglican Communion, "The Venerable" (abbreviated as "the Ven.") is the style usually given to an archdeacon.

== Eastern Orthodoxy ==
In the Eastern Orthodox Church, the term venerable is commonly used as the English-language translation of the title given to monastic saints (Greek: ὅσιος, romanized: hosios, Church Slavonic: преподобный, romanized: prepodobni; both Greek and Slavonic forms are masculine).

A monastic saint who was martyred for the Orthodox faith is referred to as a venerable martyr.

In the 20th century, some English-language Orthodox sources began to use the term venerable to refer to a righteous person who was a candidate for glorification (canonization), most famously in the case of John of Shanghai and San Francisco. This has not altered the original usage of the term in reference to monastic saints.

== Chinese Buddhism ==
In Chinese Buddhism, "venerable" is a title of great respect for highly virtuous and learned monks and nuns, translated as Zūnzhě (尊者), Fǎshī (法师; 法師) or Shīfu (师父; 師父). It emphasizes their wisdom, virtue, and status within the monastic community, similar to the use of "Venerable Master", a title that denotes a monastic or sagely figure.

== See also ==
- Lists of venerable people
