= Folk saint =

Spirit unofficially recognized by a group of people

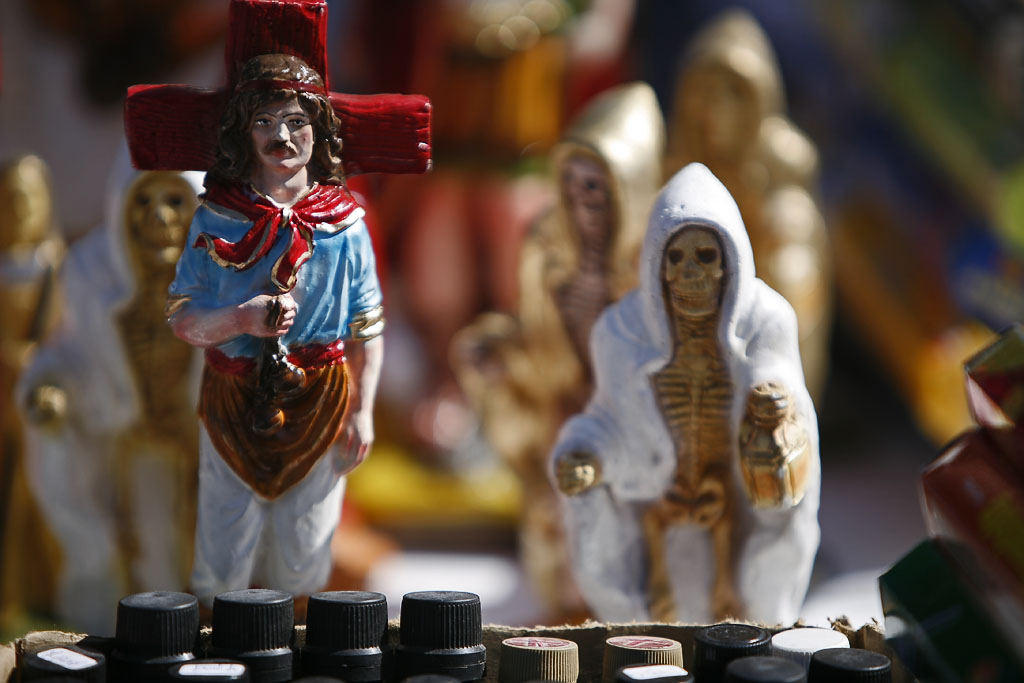
Gauchito Gil (left) and San La Muerte (right), two examples of Argentine folk saints

Folk saints are dead people or other spiritually powerful entities (such as indigenous spirits) venerated as saints, but not officially canonized. Since they are saints of the "folk", or the populus, they are also called popular saints. Like officially recognized saints, folk saints are considered intercessors with God, but many are also understood to act directly in the lives of their devotees.

Frequently, their actions in life, as well as in death, distinguish folk saints from their canonized counterparts: official doctrine would consider many of them sinners and false idols. Their ranks are filled by folk healers, indigenous spirits, and folk heroes. Folk saints occur throughout the Catholic and Orthodox world, and they are especially popular in Latin America, where most have small followings; a few are celebrated at the national or even international level.

== Origins ==
In the pre-Christian Abrahamic tradition, the prophets and holy people who were honored with shrines were identified by popular acclaim rather than official designation. In fact, the Islamic counterparts of the Christian saints, associated most closely with Sufism, are still identified this way. Early Christians followed in the same tradition when they visited the shrines of martyrs to ask for intercession with God.

Thus, there is a long tradition for the veneration of unofficial saints, and modern folk saints continue to reach popularity in much the same way as ever. Tales of miracles or good works performed during the person's life are spread by word of mouth, and, according to anthropologist Octavio Ignacio Romano, "if exceptional fame is achieved, it may happen that after his [or her] death the same cycle of stories told during life will continue to be repeated." Popularity is likely to increase if new miracles continue to be reported after death. Hispanic studies professor Frank Graziano explains:

[M]any folk devotions begin through the clouding of the distinction between praying for and praying to a recently deceased person. If several family members and friends pray at someone's tomb, perhaps lighting candles and leaving offerings, their actions arouse the curiosity of others. Some give it a try—the for and the to begin intermingling—because the frequent visits to the tomb suggest that the soul of its occupant may be miraculous. As soon as miracles are announced, often by family members and friends, newcomers arrive to send up prayers, now to the miraculous soul, with the hope of having their requests granted.

This initial rise to fame follows much the same trajectory as that of the official saints. Professor of Spanish Kathleen Ann Myers writes that Rose of Lima, the first canonized American saint, attracted "mass veneration beginning almost at the moment of the mystic's death." Crowds of people appeared at her funeral, where some even cut off pieces of her clothing to keep as relics. A lay religious movement quickly developed with Rosa de Lima at the center but she was not officially canonized until half of a century later. In the meantime, she was essentially a folk saint.

As the Church spread, it became more influential in regions that celebrated deities and heroes that were not part of Catholic tradition. Many of those figures were incorporated into a local variety of Catholicism: the ranks of official saints then came to include a number of non-Catholics or even fictional persons. Church leaders made an effort in 1969 to purge such figures from the official list of saints, though at least some probably remain. Many folk saints have their origins in this same mixing of Catholic traditions and local cultural and religious traditions. To distinguish canonized saints from folk saints, the latter are sometimes called animas or "spirits" instead of saints.

== Local character ==
Folk saints tend to come from the same communities as their followers. In death, they are said to continue as active members of their communities, remaining embedded within a system of reciprocity that reaches beyond the grave. Devotees offer prayers to the folk saints and present them with offerings, and folk saints repay the favors by dispensing small miracles. Many folk saints inhabit marginalized communities, the needs of which are more worldly than others; they therefore frequently act in a more worldly, more pragmatic, less dogmatic fashion than their official counterparts. Devotion to folk saints, then, frequently takes on a distinctly local character, a result of the syncretic mixing of traditions and the particular needs of the community.

The contrast between the manner in which Latin American and European folk saints are said to intercede in the lives of their followers provides a good illustration. In Western Europe, writes anthropologist and religious historian William A. Christian, "the more pervasive influence of scientific medicine, the comparative stability of Western European governments and above all, the more effective presence of the institutional Church" have meant that unofficial holy people generally work within established doctrine. Latin American holy persons, on the other hand, often stray much further from official canon. Whereas European folk saints serve merely as messengers of the divine, their Latin American counterparts frequently act directly in the lives of their devotees.

During the Counter-Reformation in Europe, the Council of Trent released a decree "On the Invocation, Veneration, and Relics, of Saints, and on Sacred Images", which explained that, in Roman Catholic doctrine, images and relics of the saints are to be used by worshipers to help them contemplate the saints and the virtues that they represent but that those images and relics do not actually embody the saints. In the same way, folk saints in Europe are seen as intermediaries between penitents and the divine but are not considered powerful in and of themselves. A shrine may be built "that becomes the location for the fulfillment of the village's calendrical obligations and critical supplications to the shrine image—the village's divine protector," Christian writes, but "in this context the shrine image and the site of its location are of prime importance; the seer merely introduces it, and is not himself or herself the focal point of the worship."

In pre-Columbian Mesoamerican tradition, on the other hand, representation meant embodiment of these holy figures rather than mere resemblance, as it did in Europe. Thus, pre-Hispanic Mexican and Central American images were understood to actually take on the character and spirit of the deities they represented, a perspective that was considered idolatry by European Catholics. As the inheritors of this tradition, folk saints of the region often are seen to act directly in the lives of their devotees rather than serving as mere intermediaries, and they are themselves venerated. Visitors frequently treat the representations of folk saints as real people, observing proper etiquette for speaking to a socially superior person or to a friend depending on the spirit's disposition—shaking hands, or offering it a cigarette or a drink.

The popularity of a particular folk saint also depends on the changing dynamics and needs of the community over time. The popular devotion to Yevgeny Rodionov provides an example. Rodionov was a Russian soldier who was killed by rebels in Chechnya after he reportedly refused to renounce his religion or remove a cross he wore around his neck. He is not recognized by the Russian Orthodox Church as an official saint; yet, within a few years of his death, he had gained a popular following: his image appeared in homes and churches around Russia, his hometown started drawing pilgrims, and he began to receive prayers and requests for intercession. Rodionov became a favorite folk saint for soldiers and came to represent Russian nationalism at a time of conflict when the country was still reeling from the dissolution of the Soviet Union. As one journalist observed in 2003, his death and transition into the role of a folk saint served "to fill a nationalist hunger for popular heroes" when heroes were sorely needed.

== Devotions ==
A devotee might visit the shrine of a folk saint for any number of reasons, including general requests for good health and good luck, the lifting of a curse, or protection on the road, but most folk saints have specialties for which their help is sought. Difunta Correa, for example, specializes in helping her followers acquire new homes and businesses. Juan Bautista Morillo helps gamblers in Venezuela, and Juan Soldado watches over border crossings between Mexico and the United States. This practice is not so different from that of canonized saints—St. Benedict, for example, is the patron saint of agricultural workers—but it would be hard to find a canonized saint to look after narcotics traffickers, as does Jesús Malverde. In fact, a number of folk saints attract devotees precisely because they respond to requests that the official saints are unlikely to answer. As Griffith writes, "One needs ask for help where the help is likely to be effective." So long as followers come before them with faith and perform the proper devotions, some folk saints are as willing to place a curse on a person as to lift one.

An offering to a folk saint might include the same votive candles and ex-votos (tributes of thanks) left at the shrines to canonized saints, but they also frequently include other items that reflect something of the spirit's former life or personality. Thus, Difunta Correa, who died of thirst, is given bottles of water; Maximón and the spirit of Pancho Villa are both offered cigarettes and alcohol; teddy bears and toys are left at the tomb of a little boy called Carlitos in a cemetery in Hermosillo, Mexico. Likewise, prayers to folk saints are often paired with or incorporate aspects of the Rosary but (as with many canonized saints) special petitions have been composed for many of them, each prayer evoking the particular characteristics of the saint being addressed. Other local or regional idiosyncrasies also creep in. In parts of Mexico and Central America, for example, the aromatic resin copal is burned for the more syncretic spirits like Maximón, a practice that has its roots in the offerings made to indigenous deities.

As long as the spirits come through for their followers, devotees will return. Word of mouth spreads news of cures and good fortune, and particularly responsive spirits are likely to gain a large following. Not all remain popular however, as in the case of Cutubilla whose cult has long since died out. While official saints remain canonized regardless of their popularity, folk saints that lose their devotees through their failure to respond to petitions might fade from memory entirely.

Many folk saints are venerated exclusively in private homes by their devotees. For some devotion merely consists in the veneration of images or statues and the dissemination of prints or holy cards with the saint's image. This is because a folk saint may not have a special public shrine of their own and they are not represented by the institutional Church. Instead devotees usually erect small altars in their houses decorated with images of the saint, candles, flowers and other items. They also place holy cards in their cars or in their pockets to express their devotion and through distributing holy cards. Imagery plays an essential part in the establishing of a folk saint's cult and the maintenance of that devotion.

== Relationship with the Catholic Church ==
In areas where the Catholic Church has greater power, it maintains more control over the devotional lives of its members. Thus, in Europe, folk devotions that are encouraged by the Church are quickly institutionalized, while those that are discouraged usually die out or continue only at reduced levels. For similar reasons, folk saints are more often venerated in poor and marginalized communities than in affluent ones. Nor are folk saints found in shrines to the canonical saints, though the reverse is often true: it is not uncommon for a folk saint's shrine to be decorated with images of other folk saints as well as members of the official Catholic communion. Shrines in the home, too, frequently include official and unofficial saints together. Graziano explains:

Catholicism is not so much abandoned as expanded [by folk practitioners]; it is stretched to encompass exceptional resources. Whereas Catholicism ... defends a distinction between canonical and non-canonical or orthodox and heterodox, folk devotion intermingles these quite naturally and without reserve.

Nonetheless, Catholics are generally discouraged from cultivating a devotion to folk saints (owing to a lack of certainty that the said person is in heaven or not or if doubt remains as to whether the person ever existed). In contrast, other folk saints such as San la Muerte and Santa Muerte are outright condemned by the Catholic Church as being evil and abominable.

== List of folk saints by country ==
Picture	Name	Died	Countries of Devotion	Shrine	Patronage	Notes
	Constantina of Rome	354	Italy	Santa Costanza, Via Nomentana, Rome, Italy	Maidens, sick people, people who want to convert to Catholicism	Eldest daughter of Constantine I, whose conversion took place after allegedly directing prayers to Saint Agnes and being cured
	Lewina	7th century	England	St. Leonard's Church, Seaford, East Sussex, England	The persecuted, the oppressed, those who suffer unjustly, Seaford, England	Romano-British virgin put to death by Saxon invaders
	Mabyn	650	Cornwall	St Mabyn Parish Church, St Mabyn, Cornwall, England	Agriculture, farmers, harvests, protector of livestock, St Mabyn	Daughter of King Brychan, sister of Saint Nectan
	Eadburh of Bicester	650	England	Bicester Priory, Bicester, Oxfordshire, England	Women's rights, women's education, female empowerment	7th century Old English nun, abbess, daughter of King Penda of Mercia
	Veronus of Lembeek	863	Belgium	Church of Saint Veronus, Lembeek, Belgium	Headaches, typhus, rheumatism, fever, contagious diseases, ulcers, beer and Lembeek	Son of Louis the German and twin brother of Verona of Leefdaal
	Verona of Leefdaal	870	Belgium	Chapel of Saint Verona, Leefdaal, Belgium	Fever	Daughter of Louis the German and twin sister of Veronus of Lembeek
	Wigbert	747	Germany, Netherlands, England	Wigbertikirche, Ohrdruf, Germany	Missionaries, farmers, gardeners, Thuringia, Ohrdruf, Bad Hersfeld	Anglo-Saxon Benedictine monk, missionary, disciple of Saint Boniface
	Alberic of Utrecht	784	Netherlands	Dom Church, Utrecht, Netherlands		Benedictine monk, bishop of Utrecht
	Ida of Lorraine	1113	France, Belgium	Church of Saint Ida, Bouillon, Belgium	Protection of women and children, and those seeking charity, and generosity	Wife of Count Eustace II, mother of Eustace III of Boulogne, Godfrey of Bouillon and King Baldwin; founded several monasteries in Northern France in later life
	Henry of Coquet (known as Saint Henry the Dane)	1127	England	Coquet Island, Northumberland, England		Danish hermit who lived in a hermitage on Coquet Island
	William of Norwich	1144	England	Norwich Cathedral, Norwich, England	Adopted children, the falsely accused, torture victims, Norwich	English boy whose disappearance and killing was blamed on the Jews
	David I King of Scots	1153	Scotland	Dunfermline Abbey, Dunfermline, Scotland	The arts, the environment, Kelso Abbey, Dunfermline Abbey, Scotland	26th king of Alba, prince of the Cumbrians; founded several monasteries in Scotland
	Harold of Gloucester	1168	England	Gloucester Cathedral, Gloucester, England	Kidnapped children, torture victims	English boy whose murder was allegedly motivated by the blood libel
	Godric	1170	England	Finchale Priory, County Durham, England	Fishermen, sailors, Durham	English hermit, sailor, merchant, and centenarian
	Niels of Aarhus	1180	Denmark	Aarhus Cathedral, Aarhus, Denmark		Danish prince who lived an ascetic life; cult extinct by the 18th century
	Robert of Bury	1181	England	Bury St Edmunds Abbey, Bury, Suffolk, England		English boy who was allegedly kidnapped and ritually murdered by Jews on Good Friday; cult suppressed in 1536
	Anders of Slagelse (known as Hellig Anders)	late 12th century	Denmark	Saint Peter's Church, Slagelse, Denmark	The arts, Slagelse	12th century parish priest from Slagelse
	Robert Flower (known as Robert of Knaresborough)	1218	England	St Robert's Cave and Chapel of the Holy Cross, Knaresborough, England	Outcasts, misfits, Knaresborough	12th century English hermit who lived in a cave
	Guðmundur Arason	1237	Iceland	Hólar Cathedral, Hólar, Iceland	Iceland, Icelanders	12th century bishop of Hólar
	Theobald of Marly	1247	France, Quebec	Vaux-de-Cernay Abbey, Cernay-la-Ville, France	Farmers, protection against bad weather and crop failure, eye disease, Oblates of Mary Immaculate	13th century French knight, Cistercian monk, and abbot
	Dominic del Val (known as Dominguito)	1250	Spain	Dominguito del Val Chapel, Zaragoza Cathedral, Zaragoza, Spain	Altar boys, acolytes, choirboys	Aragonese choirboy allegedly murdered in a blood libel; the veracity of the story of his murder is disputed.
	Hugh of Lincoln (known as Little Hugh of Lincoln)	1255	England	Lincoln Cathedral, Lincoln, England		English boy allegedly murdered in a blood libel
	Guglielma (known as Wilhelmina of Bohemia)	1279 or 1282	Italy		The Guglielmites	Italian noblewoman; self-alleged daughter of King Ottokar I; preached a feminized version of Christianity, founded the Guglielmites who worshipped her as the Holy Spirit incarnate; cult was suppressed in 1300
	John Schorne	1313	England	Schorne Well, North Marston, Buckinghamshire, United Kingdom	Gout and toothache	English priest from North Marston who became renowned for his piety and miraculous cures for gout and toothache
	Richard Rolle	1349	England	Church of the Holy Trinity, Hampole, South Yorkshire, England	Spiritual writers, mysticism	English hermit, mystic, and religious writer
	Girolamo Savonarola	1498	Italy		Against persecution	Dominican friar and reformer killed for heresy in Renaissance Florence
	Potenciana	16th century	Spain, Italy, Mexico, Philippines, United States	Church of All Saints, Villanueva de la Reina, Spain		16th century Spanish Anchoress
	Francisco Jiménez de Cisneros	1517	Spain	Toledo Cathedral, Toledo	Dakhla, Western Sahara, students, scholors, educators.	Spanish Cardinal, theologian, Archbishop of Toledo, and Primate of Spain; helped preserve the Mozarabic Rite from extinction
	Catherine of Aragon	1536	Spain; United Kingdom; Italy; France	Peterborough Cathedral, Peterborough, England		First wife of King Henry VIII; mother of Queen Mary I of England
	Amakusa Shirō	1638	Japan			Japanese Catholic samurai and revolutionary
	King Charles the Martyr	1649	England	St George's Chapel, Windsor, United Kingdom		24th King of England (1625–1649), head of the House of Stuart. Martyr of the English Civil War
	Simón Bolívar (known as "El Libertador")	1830	Venezuela Colombia Ecuador Bolivia	National Pantheon of Venezuela,Caracas, Venezuela	Bolivarianism Venezuelans Latin America	Venezuelan statesman and military officer who led what are currently the countries of Colombia, Venezuela, Ecuador, Peru, Panama, and Bolivia to independence from the Spanish Empire.
	Apolinario de la Cruz (known as Hermano Pule)	1841	Philippines	Tayabas, Quezon, Philippines	Cofradía de San José, religious freedom, peace, native Filipinos	Filipino religious leader and revolutionary
	Stephen 'Stoney' Brennan	1845	Ireland	Westbridge Street Loughrea, Co Galway	Invoked by women seeking husbands and for those seeking cures for illnesses/ailments. (People kiss his head carving)	A poor Irish man hanged for stealing a turnip in 1845. Nothing else is known about him except that he was ''the seventh son of a seventh son'' and believed to be a healer.
	Jean Marie Villars	1868	United States	Holy Cross Cemetery, Indianapolis, Indiana	financial problems, good health, fortune, finding lost things, murder victims	French-American priest in Indiana who died under mysterious circumstances
	Marie Laveau	1881	United States	Marie Laveau's tomb, New Orleans, Louisiana	Invoked by Herbalists, mid-wives, Spiritualists, diviners, and Wangateurs, for love, luck, health, and general blessings.	A Louisiana Creole freed-woman, business owner, hair dresser and Voodoo Priestess in New Orleans.
	Héléna Soutadé	1885	France	Terre-Cabade Cemetery, Toulouse, France	children	French teacher and mystic
	María Adelaide de Sam José e Sousa (known as Saint Maria Adelaide)	1885	Portugal	Saint Maria Adelaide Chapel, Arcozelo, Portugal		Portuguese woman with incorruptible body
	Pancho Sierra	1891	Argentina	Salto Cemetery, Buenos Aires, Argentina		Argentine faith healer
	José Rizal	1896	Philippines	Iglesia Sagrada ni Lahi, Dapitan, Zamboanga del Norte, Philippines	Rizalista religious movements	Filipino nationalist and polymath during the end of the Spanish colonial period of the Philippines.
	José Tomás de Sousa Martins	1897	Portugal	Campo dos Mártires da Pátria, Lisbon, Portugal		Portuguese physician and philanthropist
	Francesc Canals i Ambrós (known as El Santet)	1899	Spain	Poblenou Cemetery, Barcelona	Marriage, fertility, non-monetary favors.	Catalan youth and miracle worker
	Teresa Urrea (known as Santa Teresa de Cabora)	1906	Mexico; United States	Chapel of Saint Teresa, San Pedro, Arizona, United States	soldiers, government, healing, Yaqui people, Mayo people, uprising, homeless, sick, revolution	Mexican mystic, folk healer, and revolutionary insurgent
	Don Pedro Jaramillo	1907	United States	Don Pedro Jaramillo Shrine, Falfurrias, Texas, United States	cures, good health, fortune, healing, protection from diseases	Mexican-American curandero, faith healer, and clairvoyant
	Maria Izilda de Castro Ribeiro (known as Menina Izildinha, Angel of the Lord)	1911	Portugal; Brazil	Mausoleum of Menina Izildinha, Monte Alto, São Paulo, Brazil	Children, adolescents, orphans, good health, social welfare, protection from harm, protection from diseases, people in poverty	Portuguese girl who died of leukemia
	Grigori Rasputin	1916	Russia			Russian mystic and self-proclaimed holy man
	José Doroteo Arango Arámbula (known as Francisco "Pancho" Villa)	1923	Mexico	Monumento a la Revolución, Mexico City, Mexico		Mexican revolutionary general and politician
	José Antonio Primo de Rivera	1936	Spain	Valley of the Fallen, Sierra de Guadarrama, Spain	Spaniards, falangists, workers.	Spanish politician, founder of Falange Española, and nationalist martyr.
	Las Adrianitas: Adriana Quiroga; Adriana Álvarez	1936	Chile	Cemetery of Copiapó, Chile		Two young prostitutes who were murdered in the mining town of Copiapó in 1936. Their tombs attract devotees from all over Atacama Region and are most commonly visited on November 1.
	Filomena Almarines	1938	Philippines	St. Filomena Chapel, St.Filomena cemetery, Biñan, Laguna, Philippines		Filipino incorrupt folk saint
	Juan Castillo Morales (known as Juan Soldado)	1938	Mexico; United States	Shrine of San Juan Soldado, Tijuana, Baja California, Mexico	good health, criminals, family problems, crossing the U.S.–Mexico border	Mexican convicted rapist and murderer turned folk saint
	José de Jesús Fidencio Síntora (known as Niño Fidencio)	1938	Mexico; United States	Fidencista Christian Church, Espinazo, Nuevo León, Mexico	healings, cures, protection from diseases	Mexican curandero
	Corneliu Zelea Codreanu	1938	Romania, Moldova	Green House, Bucharest, Romania	Romanians	Founder of the Legion of the Archangel Michael later known as the Iron Guard, nationalist martyr;
	Sara Colonia Zambrano (known as Sarita Colonia)	1940	Peru	Capilla de Santa Sarita, Callao, Peru	bus and taxi drivers, prostitutes, LGBT community, job seekers, poor, migrants	Peruvian girl credited with the ability to make miracles
	Juan Bautista Bairoletto	1941	Argentina		immigrants, prostitutes, bandits, financial problems, justice	Argentine outlaw dubbed as El Robin Hood criollo
	Eva Perón	1952	Argentina	Casa Museo Eva Perón, Los Toldos, Argentina		First Lady of Argentina (1946–1952)
	Valeriu Gafencu	1952	Romania, Moldova	Târgu Ocna, Bacău, Romania		Romanian Orthodox theologian and martyr
	Joseph Stalin	1953	Russia, Georgia	Kremlin Wall Necropolis, Moscow, Russia	Victory, patriotism, communism	Leader of the USSR from 1922 to 1953; venerated by some priests of the Russian Orthodox Church
	Miguel Ángel Gaitán (known as El Angelito Milagroso)	1967	Argentina	Banda Florida, San Juan, Argentina		Argentine baby who died in meningitis
	Che Guevara	1967	Cuba; Bolivia; Argentina	La Higuera, Bolivia; Che Guevara Mausoleum, Santa Clara, Cuba	Warfare, government, revolution	Argentine Marxist revolutionary, physician, author, guerrilla, leader, diplomat, and military theorist.
	Hồ Chí Minh	1969	Vietnam	Ho Chi Minh Mausoleum, Hanoi, Vietnam		1st President of the Democratic Republic of Vietnam (1945–1969), communist revolutionary, marxist theorist, Vietnamese politician
	Roberto Clemente	1972	Puerto Rico; United States	United States, Latin America	Athletes, Victims of racism, Victims of natural disasters, Pittsburgh, Puerto Rico, Latin Americans	Baseball player and humanitarian (1955–1972)
	Inocencia Flores	1977	Bolivia	Cementerio General de Oruro, Oruro, Bolivia		Unidentified Bolivian murder victim whose grave is the center of local devotion, especially on All Saints' Day.
	Josip Broz Tito	1980	Croatia			Former President of the Socialist Federal Republic of Yugoslavia (1953–1980)
	Seraphim Rose	1982	United States	Saint Herman of Alaska Monastery, Platina, California, United States		American Hieromonk, theologian, mystic, author; co-founded Saint Herman of Alaska Monastery
	Omayra Sánchez	1985	Colombia	Armero, Tolima, Colombia		13 years old girl trapped and killed by a landslide on the Armero Tragedy
	Ferdinand Marcos	1989	Philippines	Rizalian Brotherhood, San Quintin, Abra, Philippines	people of Ilocos Norte	10th President of the Philippines (1965–1986)
	Pablo Escobar Gaviria	1993	Colombia		drug trade, Medellín Cartel, drug lords, protection from harm	Colombian drug lord and narcoterrorist who was the founder and sole leader of the Medellín Cartel
	Yevgeny Rodionov	1996	Russia	Kuznetsky District, Penza Oblast, Russia		Russian soldier killed in First Chechen War
	Miriam Alejandra "Gilda" Bianchi	1996	Argentina	Gilda Shrine, Entre Ríos, Argentina	healing, Gilda fanatics	Argentine cumbia singer and songwriter
	Vangeliya Pandeva Gushterova (known as Baba Vanga)	1996	Bulgaria	Church of St Petka of the Saddlers, Sofia, Bulgaria	physical healing, personal problems, prophecies of life	Bulgarian clairvoyant and mystic
	Rodrigo Bueno	2000	Argentina			Argentine singer of cuarteto music
	Nikolay Guryanov	2002	Russia			Russian Orthodox priest and mystic
	Tomislav Štrbulović (known as Thaddeus of Vitovnica)	2003	Serbia	Vitovnica Monastery, Serbia		Serbian Orthodox archimandrite, elder, author, and mystic
	Felipe Camiroaga	2011	Chile	Paseo de los sueños, Estación Central, Región Metropolitana, Chile.	Women, housewives	Chilean television personality
	Hugo Rafael Chávez Frías (Known as "El Comandante Chávez")	2013	Venezuela	23 de Enero, Caracas, Venezuela	Chavism	Ex Venezuelan President, Bolivarian Revolution Leader
	Nazario Moreno González	2014	Mexico; United States	Holanda and Apatzingán, Mexico	La Familia Michoacana, Knights Templar Cartel, people of Michoacán, protection from harm, protection from Los Zetas	Mexican drug lord
	Marie-Paule Giguère	2015	Canada; United States	Our Lady of All Nations Church, Quebec, Canada	Community of the Lady of All Nations	Canadian mystic and religious movement founder
	Bhumibol Adulyadej	2016	Thailand	Wat Bowonniwet Vihara, Phra Nakhon district	Thai people	King of Thailand (1946–2016; venerated along with the rest of the living Thai royal family)
	Dobri Dobrev	2018	Bulgaria	Kremikovtsi Monastery, Sofia, Bulgaria		Bulgarian ascetic
	Diego Armando Maradona	2020	Argentina; Italy	Maradona Shrine, Naples, Italy	Iglesia Maradoniana	Argentine professional football player and manager
Legendary folk saints
	Lin Moniang (Mazu)		China; Taiwan; Vietnam most countries in Southeast Asia		The ocean and patroness of seafarers, health, fertility, business	Chinese female deity and protector of Southeast Asians
	Saint Sarah		France	Church of the Saintes Maries de la Mer, Camargue, France	Romani people	
	Escrava Anastacia		Brazil	Church of Our Lady of the Rosary, Rio de Janeiro, Brazil	abused victims	A slave woman of African descent wearing an oppressive facemask.
	Niño Compadrito		Peru	Cuzco, Peru		Son of a Spanish viceroy and an Inca princess
	Master Rákóczi (known as Count Saint Germain)		France			French spiritual master on Theosophical and post-Theosophical teachings
	María Lionza		Venezuela	Cerro María Lionza Natural Monument, Yaracuy, Venezuela	nature, love, peace, harmony, indigenous religions in Venezuela	Venezuelan goddess
	Guaicaipuro		Venezuela			Venezuelan chief of both the Teques and Caracas tribes
	Saint Wilgefortis (known as Librada)		Western Europe and some parts in Latin America	Sigüenza Cathedral, Sigüenza, Spain	relief from tribulations, in particular by women who wished to be liberated ("disencumbered") from abusive husbands, facial hair	Female saint who grew a beard
	Saint Baltasar		Argentina, Paraguay	Concepción, Tucumán	Fernando de la Mora, Paraguay	A crowned black man wearing a red robe or cloak and carrying a scepter or a staff associated with Saint Balthazar, the wise
	Lazarus (known as Lazarus, the poor)				Poor people, lepers, Order of Saint Lazarus	Legendary beggar whose story was told in one of Jesus' parables
	Saint Senara		Cornwall	St Senara's Church, Zennor, Cornwall, England	Zennor	Legendary Breton princess accused of adultery and thrown into the sea in a barrel while pregnant, washed up in Cornwall and founded Zennor
	Saint Amaro		Spain, Portugal	Ermita de San Amaro, Puerto de la Cruz	Disabled People	Catholic Abbot and sailor who claimed to have sailed across the Atlantic Ocean and reached paradise
	Saint Leticia		Spain, Corsica, formerly in England	Church of San Pedro, Ayerbe, Spain	Ayerbe	woman venerated as a virgin martyr and companion of Saint Ursula
	Celestina Abdenago (known as Anima Sola)		Mexico; Cuba; Dominican Republic		relief from tribulations	Woman pictured suffering alone in purgatory for allegedly withholding water to Jesus
	Jesús Juarez Mazo (known as Jesús Malverde)		Mexico; United States	Culiacan, Sinaloa, Mexico	drug cartels, drug trafficking, outlaws, bandits, robbers, thieves, smugglers, people in poverty	Robin Hood figure of Mexico
	Saint Sicarius of Bethlehem (known as Sicarius of Brantôme)		Israel, France	Abbey church of Saint-Pierre de Brantôme	Invoked for general cures	One of the victims of the Massacre of the Innocents
	Saint Raja		Serbia	Rajinovac Monastery Spring	Begaljica, Hard workers	A servant who was killed by his master's sons
	Deolinda Correa (known as Difunta Correa)		Argentina; Chile; Uruguay	Vallecito, Argentina	cattle herders, ranches, truck driver, gauchos	Argentine mother found dead with a baby
	Aunt Bibija		Parts of the Balkans	Chapel of Aunt Bibija, Belgrade, Serbia	Good health, Children, Romani people	A healer who miraculously cured children
	Holy Child of La Guardia		Spain	Monastery of St. Thomas of Avila, La Guardia, Spain		Spanish child allegedly murdered in a blood libel; story used as justification for the public execution of several Jews and conversos; no evidence was ever found and the child's existence is disputed
	Antonio Gil (known as Gauchito Gil)		Paraguay; Chile; Argentina	Sanctuary of Gauchito Gil, Pay Ubre, Mercedes, Corrientes	gauchos, protection from harm, luck, fortune, good health, love, healing, outlaws, bravery, deserters, folk heroes, cowboys, safe passage	Robin Hood figure of Argentina
	Santa Claus		Worldwide belief			Legendary character who is said to bring gifts on Christmas Eve associated with Saint Nicholas of Myra
	Saint Demetra		Byzantine and Ottoman Greece	Gateway in Eleusis, Greece	Agriculture	Christianization of the Greek goddess Demeter
Folk saints recognized by the Catholic Church
	Saint Menelphalus of Aix	430	France	Aix Cathedral, Aix-en-Provence, France	Aix-en-Provence	5th century metropolitan Archbishop of Aix
	St Miliau	6th century	France	Guimiliau Parish close, Guimiliau, Brittany, France	Miners, blacksmiths, farm animals, against Rheumatism, Saint-Méen-le-Grand	Breton prince martyred by his evil brother
	Saint Nectan (known as Nectan of Hartland)	510	England, Wales, Cornwall	Saint Nectan's Glen, Trethevy, Cornwall, England	Fishermen, protection against floods, protection against witchcraft, healing, Hartland, Devon	5th century Brythonic holy man and hermit, son of King Brychan Brycheiniog
	King Saint Clovis I	511	France, Italy	Basilica of Saint-Denis, Saint-Denis, France	France	First King of the Franks, founder of the Merovingian dynasty, raised pagan but converted to Christianity on Christmas Day 496 AD
	St. Cannera	530 AD	Ireland USA	St. Canera's Church, Neosho, Missouri	Against drowning, water safety, sailors, against aquaphobia, against nyctophobia	Irish virgin and hermitess
	Hildegard of the Vinzgau	783	France	Abbey of Saint-Arnould, Metz, France	Holy Roman Empire	Queen consort of the Franks and second wife of Charlemagne
	Charlemagne the Great	814	Germany, France, Austria	Aachen Cathedral, Aachen, Germany	Holy Roman Empire, Germany, against separatist wars, justice, political leaders	King of the Franks who founded the Carolingian Empire after being crowned Emperor of the Romans by the Pope in 800; Beatified in 1179
	Fulbert of Chartres	1028	France	Cathedral of Our Lady of Chartres, Chartres, France	Teachers, architects and builders, musicians, Diocese of Chartres	11th century bishop of Chartres, hymnist, teacher, and theologian
	Saint David of Munktorp	1082	Sweden	Munktorp Church, Munktorp, Västmanland, Sweden	Mentally ill, the insane, protection from fire, diocese of Västerås, Munktorp	Anglo-Saxon Bendictine monk and missionary to Sweden
	Peter of Montboissier (known as Saint Peter the Venerable)	1156	France	Cluny Abbey, Cluny, France	Cluny Abbey, Benedictines, scholars	12th century French Benedictine Abbot, author, theologian, scholar, and philosopher
	Saint Christina the Astonishing (known as Christina Mirabilis)	1224	Belgium	Church of Saint Catherine, Sint-Truiden, Belgium	Millers, people with mental disorders	Flemish woman who suffered a seizure and was presumed dead, only to have come back to life during her funeral and levitate in the air
	Gilbert de Moravia (known as Saint Gilbert of Dornoch)	1245	Scotland	Dornoch Cathedral, Dornoch, Scotland	Protection against oppression and injustice, physical and emotional violence, bishops, Caithness, Sutherland, Dornoch Cathedral	13th century Gaelic bishop of Caithness
	Gundisalvus of Amarante (known as Saint Gundisalvus of Amarante)	1259	Portugal	Saint Gundisalvus Monastery, Amarante, Portugal	Women (especially older women) who want to get married, viola players, architects, pilgrims, people who have suffered attacks	Portuguese Dominican priest remembered for his devotion and humility to whom several miraculous events are attributed; Beatified in 1561
	Werner of Oberwesel	1287	Germany	Saint Werner's Chapel, Bacharach, Germany	Winemakers	Palatine teen whose unexplained death was blamed on Jews; officially venerated by the Diocese of Trier until his cult was suppressed in 1963
	Anderl Oxner von Rinn (known as Andreas Oxner and the Child of Judenstein)	1462	Austria	Anderl Chapel, Judenstein, Rinn, Tyrol, Austria	Children, emotional distress, physical ailments, Judenstein	Austrian boy who was known for his devotion to God and mystical visions; allegedly murdered in a blood libel; beatified in 1752 by Pope Benedict XIV
	Simon of Trent (known as Simon Unverdorben)	1475	Italy	Church of St. Simon and St. Jude, Trent, Italy	Children, kidnap victims, torture victims	Italian boy allegedly murdered in a blood libel; beatified in 1588 by Pope Sixtus V; cult suppressed in 1965 by Pope Paul VI
	Joanna, Princess of Portugal (known as Princess Saint Joanna)	1490	Portugal	Church and Convent of Jesus, Aveiro, Portugal	Aveiro	Portuguese princess who wanted to be a nun; Beatified in 1693
	Sepé Tiaraju	1756	Brazil	Cathedral of St. Francis of Paola, Pelotas, Brazil		Guarani leader; Cause for beatification opened in April 2017
	Francisca de Paula de Jesus (known as Nhá Chica)	1895	Brazil	Our Lady of Conception Sanctuary, Baependi, Brazil	Brazilian poor, people ridiculed for their faith, devotees of the Immaculate Conception	Afro-Brazilian called "Mother of the Poor" known for her devotion to Our Lady; Beatified in 2013
	José Gregorio Hernández (known as Doctor of the poor)	1919	Venezuela	La Candelaria Church, Mérida, Venezuela	medical students, diagnosticians, doctors, medical patients	Venezuelan physician; Beatified in 2021
	Antônio da Rocha Marmo (known as Antoninho)	1930	Brazil	Chapel of Our Lady of Health, São José dos Campos, São Paulo, Brazil		Brazilian boy with tuberculosis who dreamed of becoming a Roman Catholic priest; Cause for sainthood opened in 2007
	Cícero Romão Batista (known as Padre Cícero)	1934	Brazil	Capela do Socorro, Juazeiro do Norte, Ceará, Brazil	Juazeiro do Norte	Brazilian Roman Catholic priest and politician; Cause for sainthood opened in August 2022
	Odette Vidal Cardoso (known as Odetinha)	1939	Brazil	Basilica of the Immaculate Conception, Rio de Janeiro, Brazil		Brazilian girl known for her prayer life, acts of charity and purity; Declared Venerable in November 2021
	Sãozinha de Alenquer (known as the Little Flower of Abrigada)	1940	Portugal	Mausoleum of Sãozinha, Alenquer, Portugal		Young Portuguese girl remembered for her dedication to the Catholic faith and her purity; Cause for sainthood opened in 1994
	Phanxicô Xaviê Trương Bửu Diệp	1946	Vietnam	Chapel of Trương Bửu Diệp, Giá Rai, Cà Mau, Vietnam		Vietnamese priest and martyr; Beatified on 2 July 2026
	Francisco Rodrigues da Cruz (known as Padre Cruz)	1948	Portugal	Mausoleum of Padre Cruz, Benfica Cemetery, Lisbon, Portugal	Priests, sick, prisoners, poor, devotees of the Immaculate Heart of Mary	Portuguese priest revered for his apostolic fervor and charity; Cause for sainthood opened in March 1951
	Melchora Saravia Tasayco (known as La Melchorita)	1951	Peru	Santuario de la Beata Melchorita, Chincha, Peru		Peruvian Franciscan tertiary and mystic; Cause for sainthood opened in April 1978
	Bernard Francis Casey (known as Solanus Casey)	1957	United States	St. Bonaventure Monastery, Detroit, Michigan, United States	Broadcasters, pro-life activists, the poor and marginalized, healing, vocations, Detroit	American priest, friar and religious leader; Beatified in 2017
	Charlene Richard (known as the Little Cajun Saint)	1959	United States	St. Edward Church, Richard, Louisiana, United States	Cajun people, good health, converts to Catholicism	Cajun girl who died of leukemia; Cause for sainthood opened in January 2020
	Nelson Santana (known as Nelsinho)	1964	Brazil	Senhor Bom Jesus Church, Ibitinga, São Paulo, Brazil		Brazilian boy who died of cancer and found solace in faith; Declared Venerable in May 2019
	Fulton Sheen	1979	United States	St. Mary's Cathedral, Peoria, Illinois, United States	Broadcasters, pro-life activists, Catholic educators, Catholic converts, those who suffer from addictions	American bishop, author, teacher, theologian, radio host, and televangelist; Beatified in 2026
	Maria Aparecida Berushko (known as Tita)	1986	Ukraine; Brazil	Ukrainian Orthodox Parish of Saint Nicholas, Joaquim Távora, Paraná, Brazil	Teachers, students, schooling	Brazilian teacher who donated her life to save her students from a fire; Cause for sainthood opened in October 2005 by Orthodox Church of Ukraine
	Maria Rita de Sousa Brito Lopes Pontes (known as Sister Dulce of the poor)	1992	Brazil	Roma, Salvador, Bahia, Brazil	Poor, homeless, beggars, sick, prisoners, working class, Baianos.	Brazilian Catholic nun Known for defending marginalized people; Canonized on 13 October 2019 by the Catholic Church. First Brazilian female saint.
Popular saints identified with folkloric beings
	Santa Muerte		Mexico; United States; Central America	Shrine of Most Holy Death, Mexico City, Mexico	love, prosperity, good health, fortune, healing, safe passage, protection against witchcraft, protection against assaults, protection against gun violence, protection against violent death, safe delivery to the afterlife	Mexican female deity and personification of death
	San La Muerte		Paraguay; Argentina		restore love, good fortune, gambling, protection against witchcraft, protection against imprisonment, inmates, prisoners, luck, good health, vengeance	Skeletal folk saint; male version of Santa Muerte
	San Pascualito (known as San Pascualito Muerte)		Guatemala; Mexico	Capilla de San Pascualito, Olintepeque, Guatemala	curing diseases, death, healings, cures, vengeance, love, graveyards	Folk saints associated with Saint Paschal Baylon
	El Tío (known as Lord of the Underworld)		Bolivia	Cerro Rico, Potosí Bolivia	Miners	Figure associated with the devil who receives gifts in exchange for protection
	Maximón		Guatemala	Santiago Atitlán, Guetamala	health, crops, marriage, business, revenge, death	Mayan deity
Animals venerated as folk saints
	Saint Guinefort	13th century	France		Dogs, dog owners, children, infants	13th-century French Greyhound; devotion suppressed by the Catholic Church but persisted until 1930

== See also ==
- Apotheosis
- Folk religion
- Chinese folk religion
- Chinese rites controversy
- Orisha
- Phallic saint
- Secular saint
- Military saint
- Category:Supernatural beings identified with Christian saints

== Sources ==
- Graziano, Frank (2007). Cultures of Devotion: Folk Saints of Spanish America. Oxford: Oxford University Press. ISBN 978-0-19-517130-3.
- Griffith, James S. (2003). Folk Saints of the Borderlands: Victims, Bandits & Healers. Tucson: Rio Nuevo Publishers. ISBN 1-887896-51-1.
- Macklin, B.J.; N.R. Crumrine (1973). "Three North Mexican Folk Saint Movements". Comparative Studies in Society and History. pp. 89–105.
