= J.M. Villars =

American Catholic priest and folk saint

Father J.M. Villars

Personal life
- Born: 1818 Chavanay, Kingdom of France
- Died: March 5, 1868 (age 50) Richmond, Indiana
- Resting place: Holy Cross Cemetery, Indianapolis, Indiana

Religious life
- Religion: Catholic
- Profession: Priest
- Ordination: 1848 in Dubuque, Iowa

J.M. Villars

Priest, saint
- Born: 1818; Chavanay, France
- Died: March 5, 1868 (aged 50); Richmond, Indiana, United States
- Venerated in: Folk Catholicism

Father J.M. Villars (circa 1818 – March 5, 1868) was a Catholic priest in Indiana. He died in mysterious circumstances in 1868. He has since become a folk saint.

== Life ==
Villars was born in Chavanay, France, in 1818. He was ordained as a priest in Dubuque, Iowa, in 1848. From 1862 to 1863 he served as an assistant at St. John's in Indianapolis, then moved to Richmond, Indiana, to lead St. Mary's church. He also took over as a visiting priest for the church in Cambridge, Indiana, when the missionary who founded it became unable to continue running it.

== Death ==
On Friday, March 6, 1868, when Villars did not show up for mass an altar boy was sent to check on him and found him dead in his bedroom, with his suspenders looped around the bedpost and his neck. The death was officially determined to be a suicide, but many suspected murder. He was buried in Holy Cross Cemetery on the south side of Indianapolis.

== Folk saint ==
People began making pilgrimages to Villars' grave in the early 1910s, inspired by a woman who dreamed she saw Villars "hanging by a rope the victim of murder." The woman visited Villars' grave and prayed for her son who miraculously recovered. In the 1930s there were many reports of miraculous intercession by Villars, including a woman whose home was saved from foreclosure.

Although the local archdiocese has done nothing to encourage people, and claims that there is "nothing special about Villars" people continue to visit the grave, praying and leaving coins and notes with pleas for miracles.
