= Pierre Véron =

Pierre Véron may refer to:

- Pierre Véron (writer) (1833–1900), French writer and journalist
- Pierre Véron (lawyer) (born 1947), French lawyer and specialist in the field of patent litigation
