= Verona of Leefdaal =

Belgian Catholic Saint

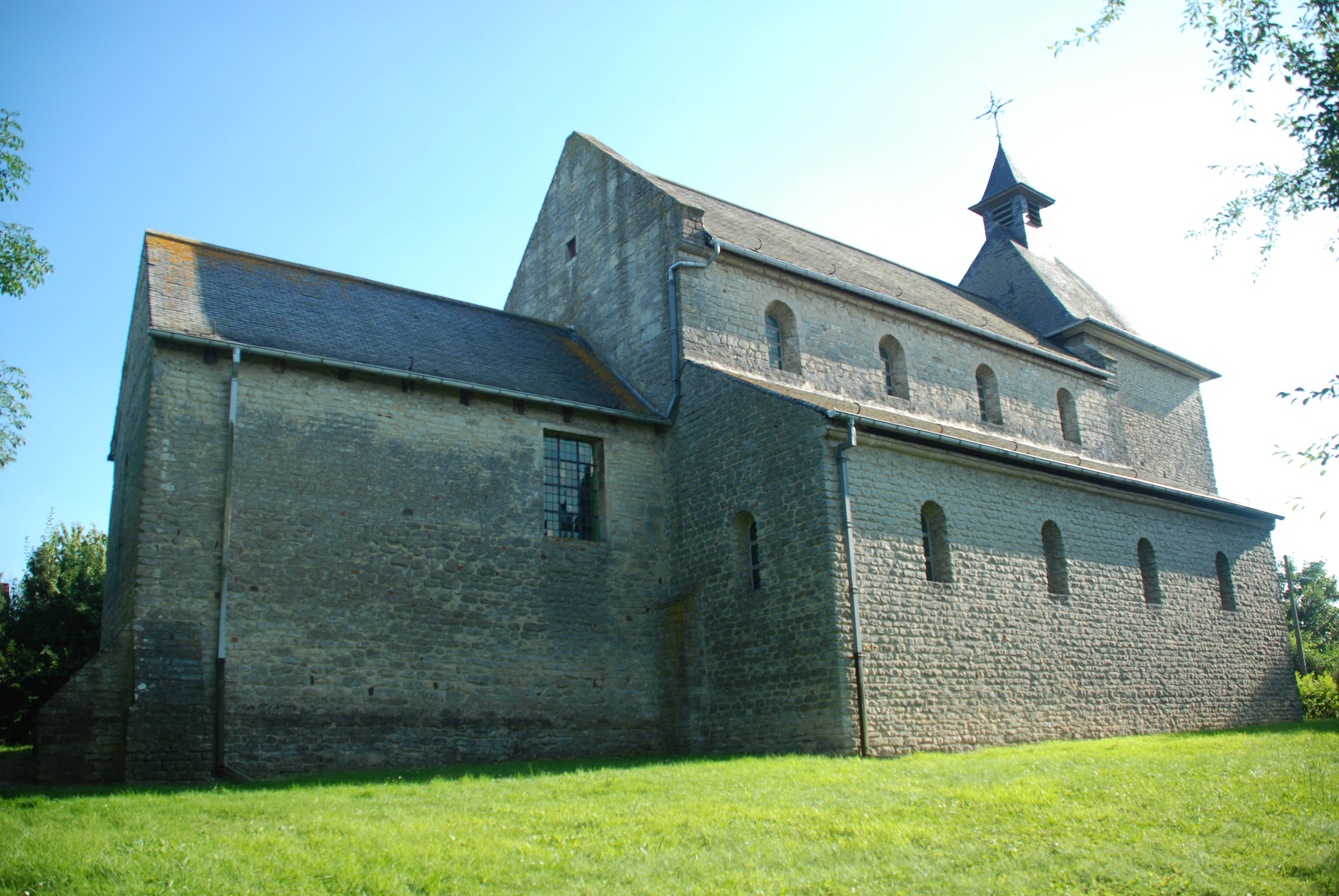
Chapel of Saint Verona in Leefdaal, Belgium

Verona of Leefdaal (French: Vérona de Leefdael, Dutch: Verona van Leefdaal) is a medieval folk saint, venerated in her adopted hometown of Leefdaal, currently part of the municipality of Bertem, Flemish Brabant, Belgium. According to tradition, Verona was the sister of Veronus of Lembeek and a great-granddaughter of Charlemagne.

== Overview ==
According to tradition, Saint Verona was born in the Rhineland, the daughter of Louis the German. While looking for the grave of her twin brother Veronus, Verona took a rest at a roadside chapel in Leefdaal. Here, the voice of God apparently revealed two secrets to Verona: she could find her brother's grave in Lembeek; and she would be buried underneath the chapel in which she was presently resting. She went on her way and found her brother's grave in Lembeek, before returning to her native Rhineland, where she established a number of convents before dying in 870. Her body was then brought by oxen to Leefdaal.

Verona is worshipped in the Sint-Verona chapel in Leefdaal, which displays an 18th-century statue of her. According to some philological interpretations, Verona never existed and the name of the St Verona chapel actually comes from a local hill named Vroienberg, which means "hill of the Lord".

== See also ==
- Veronus of Lembeek
- Veron
- Veranus of Cavaillon, or Véran
