= Filomena Almarines =

Filipina female folk saint

- Born: July 6, 1913
- Hometown: Binan, Laguna
- Died: August 13, 1938
- Honored in: Folk catholicism in the Philippines

Filomena Almarines is a Filipina woman from Biñan, Laguna venerated as a folk saint due to the discovery of her supposed incorrupt body in 1947.

== Life ==
Filomena Almarines also known as Mena was born on July 6, 1913, in Brgy. San Antonio, Biñan, Laguna to Faustina Almalel and Faustino Almarines.

She was baptized in the Aglipay Church and was reported to have attended Biñan elementary school till the 4th grade, however not continuing further with her studies due to poverty and being orphaned by her mother.

She earned her fare as a roadside vendor-selling fruits, eggs and other wares to passing truck drivers and the like. She reportedly had two "romances".

On August 13, 1938, she died at age 25 of an unconfirmed disease. and was buried in Biñan Municipal Cemetery. According to her physician, she was embalmed and put in lime before internment.

== Veneration ==
In 1947, Faustino Almarines died and it was agreed that he was to be buried with Filomena on the same plot. To the astonishment of the witnesses, Filomena's body was found to have been intact after 9 years of being buried. They placed her body inside a glass coffin to be venerated and a concrete chapel was constructed which people flocked in hopes of healing and miracles. People drew parallels to her namesake Philomena, Greek virgin and martyr. Stores selling her effigy, estampitas and bottles of miraculous water supposedly from a spring popped up around the chapel.

Both the local Catholic church and Aglipayan church refused to recognize her.

After some time, she was reinterred in the same chapel constructed for her in Biñan municipal cemetery, now also known as Sta. Filomena Public Cemetery.

== Popular culture ==
- In 1947, biographical pamphlet was written by Pedro V. Garcia detailing her romances.
- In 2016, St. Vincent School of Theology uploaded a documentary entitled The Curious Case of Sta. Filomena of Biñan, Laguna.

== See also ==
- Our Lady of Cabra Island
- Luisa Abano
- Category:Folk saints
