= Veronus of Lembeek =

Belgian Catholic Saint

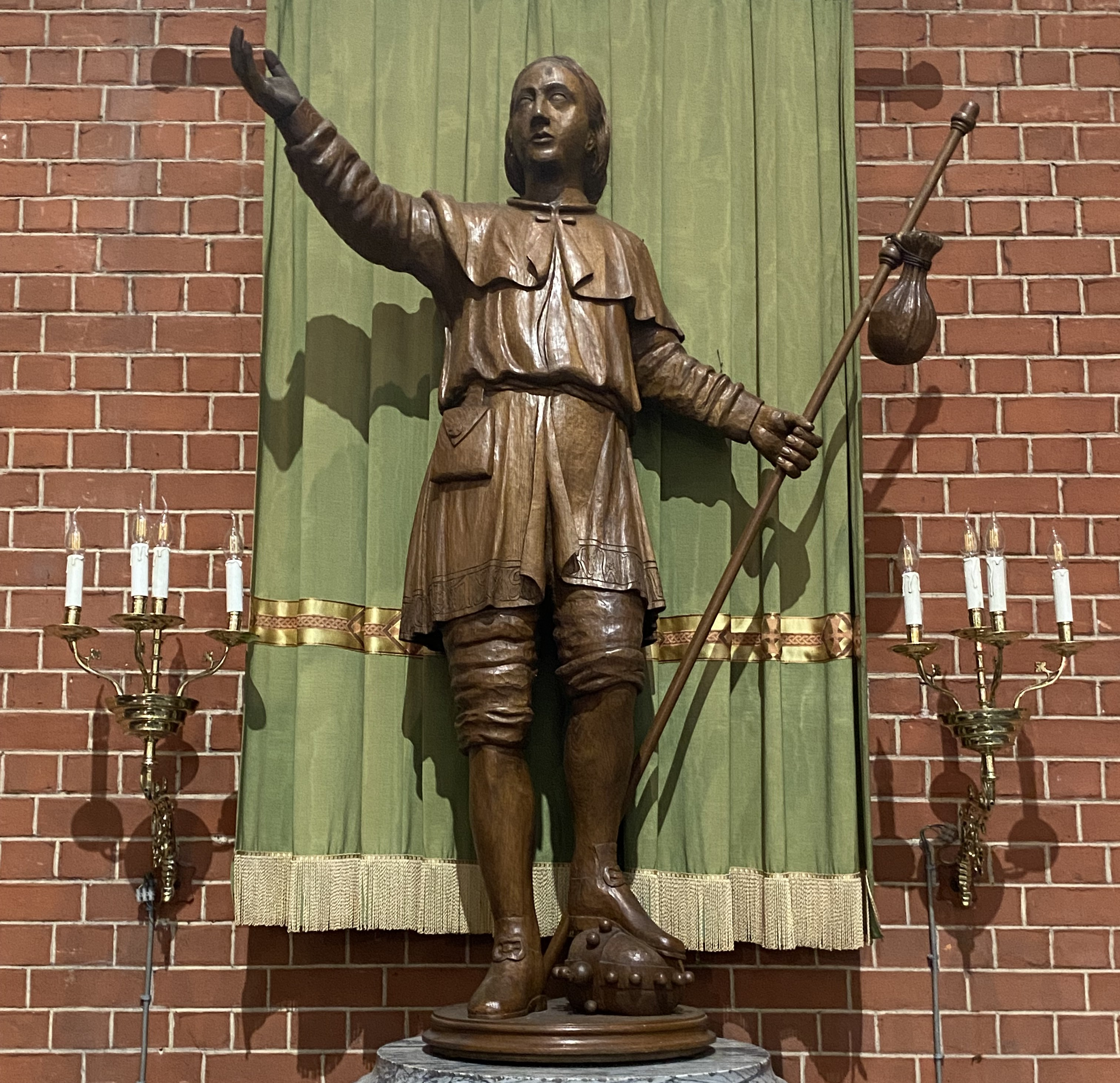
- Statue at the Lembeek village church
- Born: 8th century
- Died: January 31, 863; Lembeek
- Major shrine: Church of St Veronus, Lembeek, Belgium
- Feast: 31 January

Veronus of Lembeek (French: Véron de Lembecq, Dutch: Veroon van Lembeek) is a medieval folk saint, venerated in his adopted hometown of Lembeek, near Halle and close to the Belgian language boundary. According to tradition, Veronus chose to lived a humble life despite being a great-grandson of Charlemagne, and acquired a reputation for holiness before his death on 31 January 863.

== Biography ==
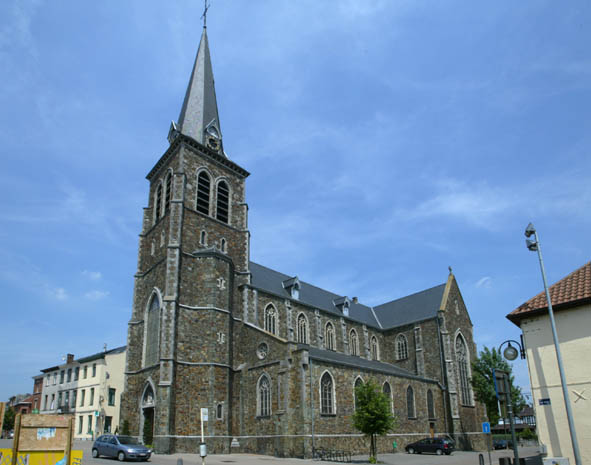
Church of Saint Veronus in Lembeek, Belgium

Whether Veronus was or not a historical person, his life is mainly known from a hagiography by Olbert de Gembloux. Gembloux's text is believed to have been written around 1020 CE at the request of Reginar IV, Count of Mons following the rediscovery of the saint's burial in 1004 and the transfer of his relics to Mons in 1012.

In that narrative, Veronus was a member of the Carolingian dynasty, perhaps a son of Louis the German. At age 16, however, he left the royal court to live a life of humble work, in imitation of Jesus. He thus became employed in a farm in Lembeek. He performed various miracles, including creating a wellspring by planting a stick in the ground, and accurately predicting details of his burial to his sister, known as Saint Verona and revered in Leefdaal.

== Tradition ==
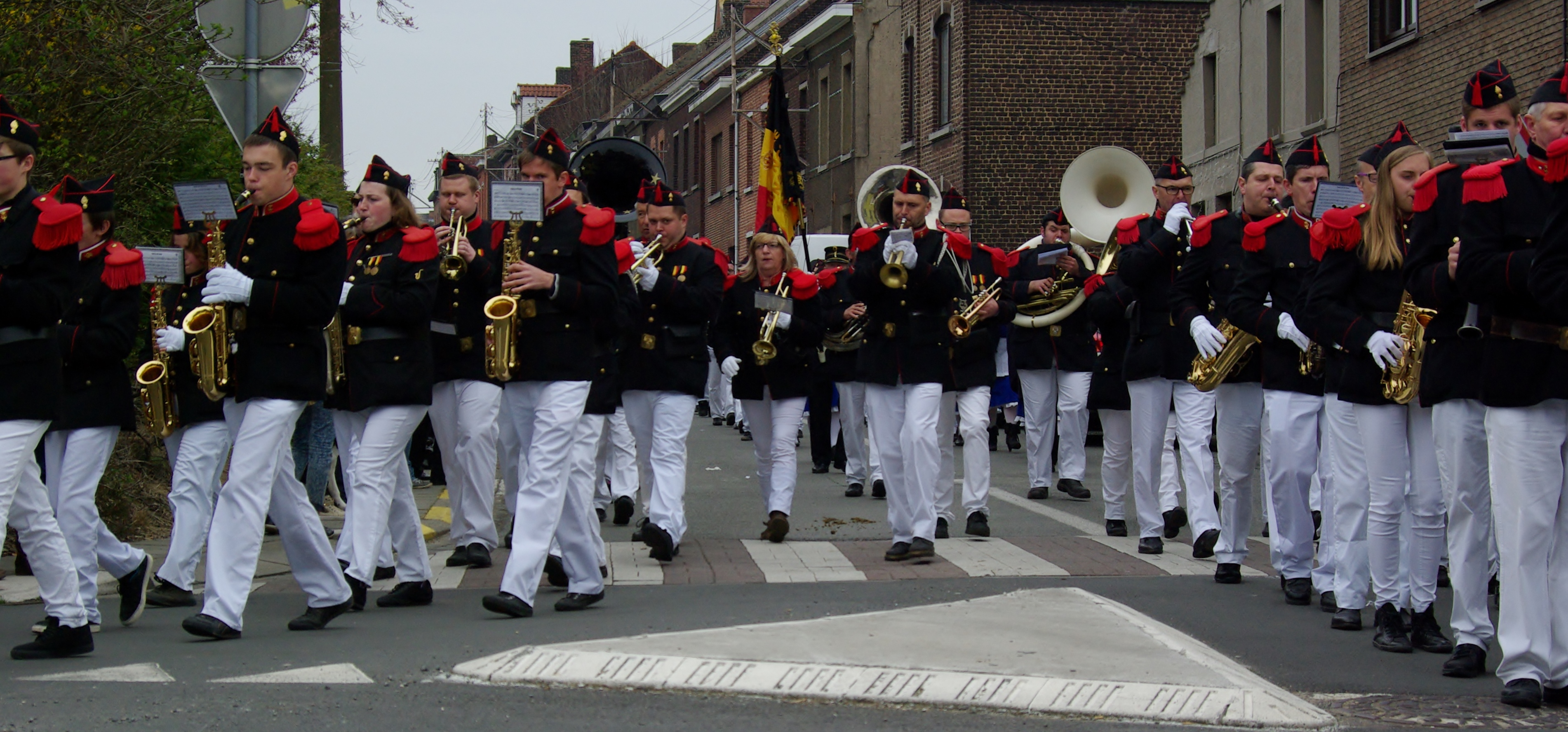
Procession of Saint Veronus in Lembeek, 2015

Veronus is invoked against headaches, typhus, rheumatism, fever, contagious diseases, and ulcers. He is liturgically commemorated on 31 January, the date of his death. Since the 15th century, he has also been honored by a procession in Lembeek on Easter Monday.

Veronus is also one of numerous saints associated with beer, and the patron saint of Belgian brewers. One claim is that lambic originates from Lembeek and specifically from the miraculous wellspring created by Veronus. A pub in Peterborough, Ontario is named after him, the St. Veronus Café and Tap Room.

Veronus is reputed to be buried in the local church of Lembeek, which is named after him and was largely rebuilt in the late 19th century. The church is named after Veronus and contains his 16th-century tomb effigy. Relics of Veronus are also held in Mons.

== See also ==
- Verona of Leefdaal
- Veron
- Veranus of Cavaillon, or Véran
