= Niño Compadrito =

Peruvian Catholic folk saint

The Niño Compadrito is a bone effigy, believed to be the skeleton of a boy, venerated as a folk saint with a local following, located in a residence in Cuzco, Peru. The skeleton has been in the care of the Belén family since at least the 1950s, The skeleton is often decorated, and has eyes of glass, lashes, teeth and a long wig. He wears a shirt, and a crown over the wig. While most followers believe Niño Compadrito as a part of their Catholicism, it has not been accepted by the Catholic Church as an official saint

== Legend ==
A prominent version of the legend of the Niño Compadrito is that he is the son of an evil viceroy and an Incan princess who was murdered by people who wanted revenge against his father. Other common versions include that his mother was a woman from Cuzco or that he himself was the cruel viceroy. Followers believe he is able to perform miracles and followers will give offerings at the shrine for this.

There is also a belief that the boy is growing; some devotees have explained that Niño Compadrito once preferred offerings for a child (e.g., toys and candy), but has grown up and now prefers pisco, cologne, cigarettes, and mini casinos.

== Relationship with the Catholic Church ==
The Catholic Church has not accepted the Niño Compradito as an official saint and the relationship between the Catholic Church and the effigy has varied since it first gained a following. In September 1976, Archbishop Luis Vallejos Santoni issued a decree from the Church of Santa Ana (Cuzco) which forbade Catholic devotion to Nino Compradrito and declared it was a form of superstitious belief. Additionally, it was suggested in this ordinance that the skeleton could be that of a monkey.

Due to the negative local media attention and anxiety from devotees about rumors the Church would confiscate and burn it, Nino Compadrito went into a period of underground activities for six years. During this period, the skeleton moved from various devotees' residences in Cuzco and provincial towns of Quillabamba and Sicuani for six months before returning to his owners' home. For the next six years, the effigy was kept out of sight and followers have dwindled.

In 1982, three "antiniñist" priests died, Archbishop Luis Vallejos Santoni, Father Dalle, and Monsignor Vallejos, at which point devotees began requesting visits again, and six months later the effigy was replaced for devotee visits. Since this period the relationship between the effigy and the Church has changed, and the effigy will sometimes be taken to the church to celebrate Mass on the Day of the Dead or other special occasions.
