= Juan Soldado =

Mexican soldier and folk saint (1918–1938)

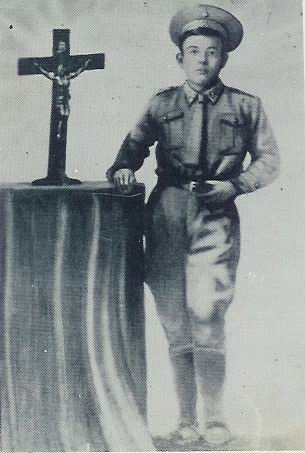

Juan the Soldier
- Born: 1918; Mexico
- Died: February 17, 1938 (aged 19–20); Tijuana, Mexico
- Venerated in: Folk Catholicism of Mexico
- Patronage: Good health, criminals, family problems, crossing the U.S.-Mexico border

Juan Castillo Morales (1918 – February 17, 1938), better known as Juan Soldado (English: Juan the Soldier), was a convicted rapist and murderer who later became a folk saint to many in northwestern Mexico and in the southwestern United States. A private in the Mexican army, Castillo Morales was executed on February 17, 1938, for the rape and murder of Olga Camacho Martínez, an 8-year-old girl from Tijuana, Baja California. His advocates contend that he was falsely accused of the crime and have appealed to his spirit for help in matters of health, criminal problems, family matters, crossing the U.S.-Mexico border, and other challenges of daily life.

== Death ==
Relatively little is known about Castillo Morales and accounts of his death vary widely. He was a private in the Mexican army from Jalisco. In 1938, while stationed in Tijuana, he was accused of the rape and murder of Olga Camacho Martínez, an eight-year-old girl who disappeared on February 13, 1938, and whose decapitated body was found shortly thereafter. The girl's father, by some accounts, was involved in a labor dispute arising out of the closing of a local casino by President Lázaro Cárdenas.

Castillo Morales was arrested and allegedly confessed, though other accounts claim he maintained his innocence until his death. A crowd, perhaps led by the girl's parents and others connected with the labor dispute, attempted to seize him while he was in custody, setting fire to the police station and the city hall and preventing firefighters from responding to the fires. Local authorities turned him over to the army, which proceeded to sentence him to death after a summary court martial.

Castillo Morales was shot pursuant to the ley de fugas, which provoked an accused person into fleeing and thus "authorized" the killing of prisoners for attempting to escape custody, but was often used as an excuse for extrajudicial executions.

He was buried at the site of his death, now the Puerta Blanca Cemetery.

== Veneration ==
Shortly after his execution, the story began circulating that Castillo Morales was innocent and had been framed by a superior officer, Jesse Cardoza, who was guilty of the crime. Residents began reporting strange events associated with Castillo Morales' gravesite shortly after his death, including blood seeping from his grave and ghostly voices. Others began leaving stones at his tomb, attributing miraculous occurrences to them.

At the Puerta Blanca cemetery, there are now small chapels dedicated to Castillo Morales. The first one is the edge of the pantheon where he died. The second chapel is for all to enter and is where it says he is buried; both chapels are regularly visited and prayed at by people who have problems crossing the border into the United States or who are involved in the human trafficking in Mexico in and around the borderland. Devotees have also claimed that he has interceded for them in other areas, such as health and family problems.

Other shrines to Juan Soldado can be found elsewhere throughout the region, while votive candles, ex-voto cards, and other religious items devoted to him are sold throughout northwestern Mexico and the areas of California and Arizona where immigrants passing through the region have established communities. Similar cults have arisen around the gravesites of other victims injustice who met a violent death and who are believed to have the power to intercede on behalf of those who pray for them.

Juan Soldado's cult reflects, in some ways, the unsettled community that Tijuana was and is. The Catholic Church had no well-established local saints in the Tijuana region and was itself compromised in the eyes of many by its association with the powerful interests against whom the Mexican Revolution had been fought. Juan Soldado, as a nearly anonymous emigrant from the countryside who was allegedly wrongly accused by the authorities, was a fitting symbol of the upheavals that the people of that era and region confronted.

== In popular culture ==
- Juan Soldado, ayúdame a cruzar ("Soldier John, help me across") – supplication voiced by illegal migrants at the tomb of Juan Soldado, prior to attempting a border crossing.
- Story of Juan Soldado, can be seen in La Leyenda de Juan Soldado, a segment in the Mexican horror movie anthology, México Bárbaro 2.
