= Veron =

Veron may refer to:

== People ==
- Veronus of Lembeek (8th century), or Saint Véron
- Aníbal Verón (died 2000), Argentine political martyr
- Danilinho (footballer, born 1987), Brazilian footballer
- Darío Verón (born 1979), Paraguayan footballer
- Eliseo Verón (born 1935), Argentine sociologist and semiotician
- Elmo Veron (1903–1990), American film editor
- Eugène Véron (1825-1889), author of L'esthétique
- François Véron (1575–1649), French Jesuit controversialist
- John Veron or Charlie Veron (born 1945), biologist specializing in coral
- Juan Ramón Verón (1944–2025), Argentine footballer
- Juan Sebastián Verón (born 1975), Argentine footballer, son of Juan Ramón
- Luis Alberto Veron (born 1992), Argentine boxer
- Louis-Désiré Véron (1798–1867), French opera manager and publisher
- Mauricio Verón (born 1977), Argentine footballer
- Nicolas Véron (born 1971), French economist
- Philippe Véron (1939–2014), French astronomer
- Pierre Véron (writer) (1833–1900), French journalist and writer
- Pierre Véron (lawyer) (born 1947), French lawyer and specialist in the field of patent litigation
- Ricardo Matias Verón (born 1981), Argentine footballer

== Other uses ==
- Véron, a village in Burgundy, France
- Veron (grape), another name for the French wine grape Fer
