= Potenciana =

Saint Potenciana
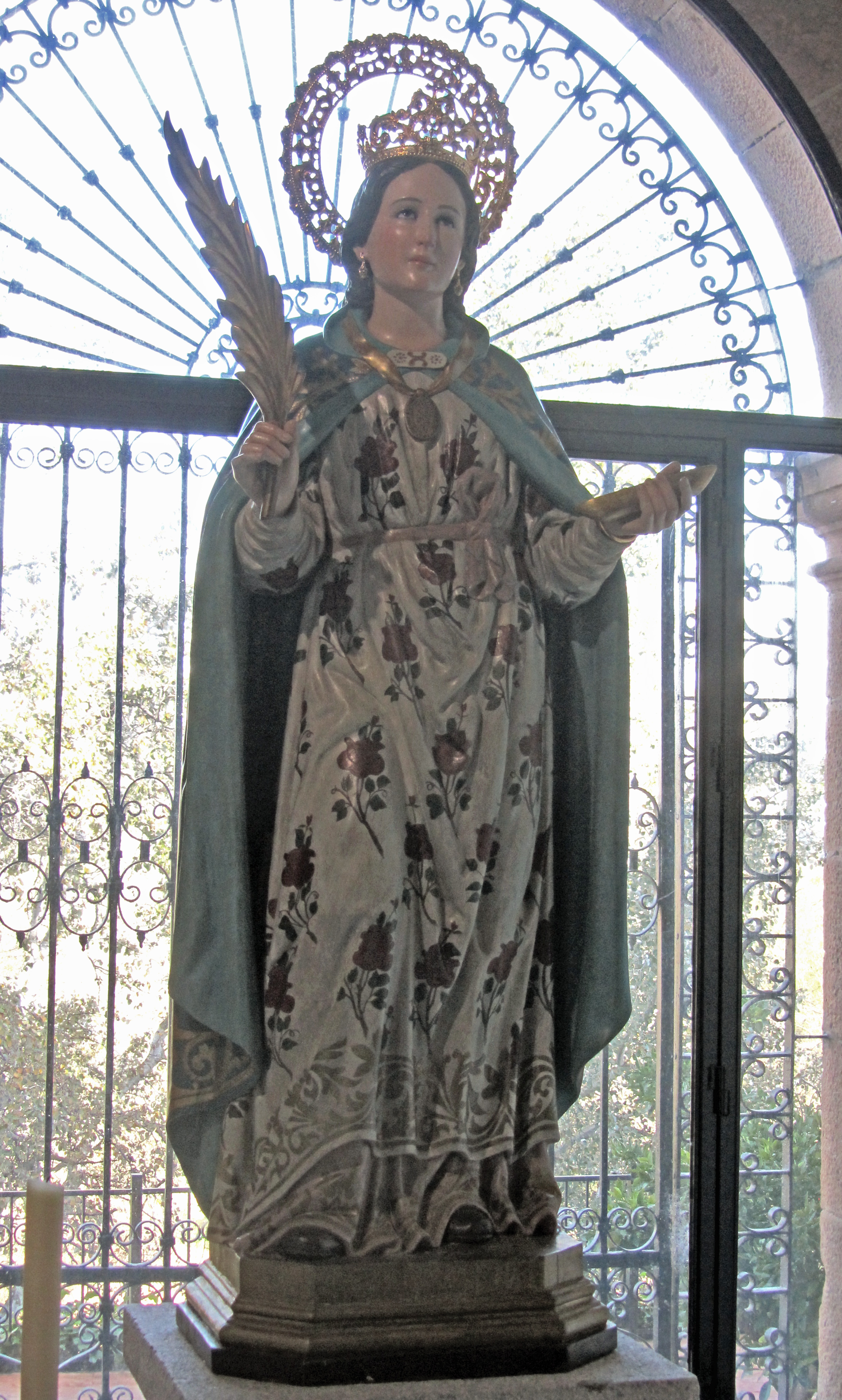

Virgin
- Born: 15th century
- Died: 16th century Villanueva de la Reina
- Major shrine: Villanueva de la Reina
- Feast: 15 April

Potenciana (in Latin Potentiana) was a Spanish virgin and anchoress, possibly of the walled-in type, who died probably in the 16th century and whose following has spread from Spain to other parts of Europe.

== Historical knowledge ==
Although much was written about Saint Potenciana, especially in the 17th century, little is known of her with certainty.

The following are the verifiable facts about her:

In the Church of All Saints on the right bank of the Guadalquivir upstream from Villanueva de la Reina there was a tomb with an inscription stating it to be that of Saint Potenciana. In the collective memory of the local community it was considered to be that of a woman who lived in poverty in a home attached to the church and worked as a weaver. She was looked on as a saint and, when she died, she was buried in the church. People removed soil from the tomb as a means of obtaining miraculous cures from sickness, especially the endemic malaria. Juan Acuña del Adarve, Prior of Villanueva, initiated a canonical examination of this cult. Some of the witnesses declared that they had themselves seen remains of the loom at which she worked, others that she had lived walled in within her home attached to the church. In 1628 the tomb was opened and the relics removed temporarily to Villanueva pending the construction of a new hermitage. Some of the relics were taken to Andújar and others to the cathedral of Jaén. In 1636 Bishop Moscoso de Sandoval declared the cult official. On 15 April 1640, the relics were again moved to the rebuilt hermitage, but they were later brought back to Villanueva because of fear of flooding from the river. In the sacking and destruction of the Villanueva church in 1936, they were thrown into the river.

One writer argued that Saint Potenciana lived in the 12th century, but his view seems to have been based on a misreading of an inscription in the church, and in any case the tomb is likely to have been later than the church. The evidence of the witnesses in the 1620s process suggests that she died not very long before and so in the 16th or 15th century, a historical, sociological and religious situation into which she would fit perfectly. Women weavers living a hermit life in dwellings attached to churches were common in the Middle Ages, and there is documentary and literary evidence that some of them lived walled in. In 1481, Isabel the Catholic exempted them from sales tax on their work.

Recently some have imagined that Saint Potenciana was martyred by being walled in. The witnesses in the 1620s process in no way suggested that she had been violently walled in or that she had been persecuted for her religion. The Office and Mass assigned to her were those of Virgins who were not Martyrs. In spite of this and other imaginative details that were later added by her devotees, it appears that the real Saint Potenciana was an ordinary woman who worked as a weaver, living a hermit's life in poverty close to All Saints Church, and who was looked on as saintly both in life and in death and earned the respect and veneration of the local people, who appealed to her for comfort and aid in their troubles and ailments.

== Patronage ==
Saint Potenciana is the patron saint of Villanueva de la Reina. She was also patron saint of Andújar until 1909.
