= Sarita Colonia =

Peruvian folk saint

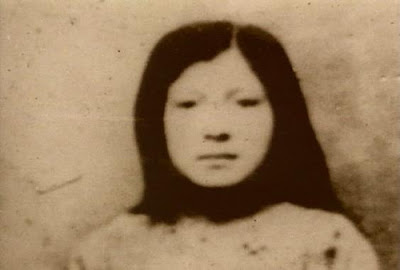
- Only existing photo of Colonia, taken in 1926
- Born: Sara Colonia Zambrano; 1 March 1914; Huaraz, Peru
- Died: 20 December 1940 (aged 26); Lima, Peru
- Venerated in: Folk Catholicism

Sara Colonia Zambrano (1 March 1914 – 20 December 1940), popularly known as Sarita Colonia, was a Peruvian woman who became a folk saint after her death. Born into poverty, she moved to Lima and worked various jobs until her death at age 26. Her burial site became a common place for prayers, and she became associated with tales of miracles and piety. She became especially popular among the poor, and she also came to be associated with other marginalized groups such as migrants, sex workers, criminals, and people of the LGBT community. A shrine was built in her honor at the height of her popularity in 1983, and her image was commonly seen in Lima during this period.

== Biography ==
Colonia was born on 1 March 1914, in the Belén neighborhood of Huaraz, Peru, to carpenter Amadeo Colonia Flores and Rosalía Zambrano. The Colonia family moved to Lima in 1922. Colonia was sent to a Catholic boarding school, and she developed a desire to become a nun. She was pulled out of the school when the family returned to Huaraz in 1926. Her mother died shortly afterward, and Colonia was forced to raise her younger siblings, including her half-siblings after her father remarried. For a time, she took a job at a bakery in Huaraz. In the early 1930s, Colonia moved back to Lima in the hope of seeking a larger income. For the following three years, she worked as a live-in maid. She then moved to Callao to live in the market and sell fish. Other jobs she worked at the time included selling clothes and working in cafés. Colonia fell severely ill and was taken to the hospital on 19 December 1940, and she died in Lima the following day. Her death was attributed to malaria, but her relatives disagreed with this diagnosis, saying that she died from ingesting castor oil. Colonia was buried in a common grave at the Baquijano cemetery in Callao.

== Religious following ==
=== Grave site and shrine ===
The location where Colonia was buried was designated with a wooden cross, causing it to become a gathering point for people grieving those without grave markers. As visitors came to her grave, answered prayers and miracles were attributed to her. Later, when the common grave was exhumed, Colonia's family relocated her remains. A shrine was built on Colonia's burial site in 1983. The shrine is made of concrete blocks, and it features a tomb, an image of Colonia, and a place for lighting prayer candles. Flowers are often purchased by visitors before entering to deliver to the shrine. Water from the tomb and from the flowers is often used for spiritual purposes, such as healing and cleansing. Each year, two festivals are held for Colonia in her shrine: one for her birth in March, and one for her death in December.

=== Followers ===
Colonia first became the subject of reverence in the 1960s and 1970s. The increase of migrants to Lima during this time allowed reverence of Colonia to spread as they became her main adherents. This generation of migrants convened around her grave, and her following spread throughout shanty towns. They used her grave as an alternative for orthodox religious practice, as she too had traveled to Lima to escape poverty. This association has caused her to be seen as a patron saint for illegal immigration to the United States, and those crossing the Mexico–United States border sometimes wear her image to seek her protection.

Colonia's grave was popularized as a place of worship for marginalized groups who were treated poorly in churches. In addition to migrants, this group has grown to include the poor more generally, such as dockworkers, maids, bus drivers, and the unemployed, as well as other outsider groups, such as criminals, sex workers, and members of the LGBT community. Colonia's relatively uneventful life of poverty adds to this effect, and the majority of her followers similarly come from poverty. Due to her association with criminals and the poor, her followers have often been perceived negatively in Lima. As bus and taxi drivers became common adherents, her image was often seen displayed in these vehicles during the 1970s and 1980s in Lima. The height of Colonia's religious following occurred in these years, when her grave had constant visitors.

Colonia is also believed to protect thieves and prisoners, and some prisoners wear tattoos of her image for her alleged protection. In 1994, police foiled a bank robbery plot by apprehending the culprits when they visited Colonia's shrine to pray for success. Due to her association with prisoners, the local prison of Callao is sometimes known as Sarita Colonia.

The Catholic Church has formally discouraged veneration of Colonia, though it became more accommodating after an increase in her popularity. By the 21st century, Colonia's image was more widely accepted in Lima, and her status as a folk saint was institutionalized into the city's culture. Her following remained steady in the early decades of the 21st century, still producing thousands of adherents during festivals but not growing in number.

=== Folk tales ===
In her life, several miracles were attributed to Colonia by her family. She was alleged to have cured her younger sister's liver disease and her father's brain injury. Her brother said that she was inspired to seek a religious life by visions of Jesus Christ and Mary. She is also said to have been rescued from a canal as a teenager by a divine man in a white tunic.

Various folk tales have developed around Colonia's life, with different traditions developing between different demographics and groups of workers. As she is commonly revered by the poor, many of these involve success in seeking work. Later stories of her life emphasized her suffering and her generosity rather than miracles. Many of these stories provide alternative accounts of her death. The most common is the belief that she died following a rape or an attempted rape, either committing suicide to protect her purity or being saved by God taking her to protect her. The rapists in these stories are often figures of authority, such as police officers, or they play on racial stereotypes, portrayed as having darker skin while Colonia is portrayed as white. In 1999, Colonia's brother wrote a biography with the stated purpose of correcting falsehoods that had been spread about her life.

== Image and media ==
Colonia's name and image are recognized in Lima and often reproduced, including on a variety of merchandise featuring her depiction. Depictions of Colonia are typically based on the lone existing photograph of her, taken in 1926 when she was 12 years old. As with many popular cultural figures, depictions are more likely to portray her as a white woman. She also appears in fiction, including the 1990 book Sarita Colonia viene volando (transl. Sarita Colonia Comes Flying) by Eduardo González Viaña. The debut album of Los Mojarras, titled Sarita Colonia, features cover art of a Sarita Colonia tattoo. The crime procedural show Gamboa featured an episode in the 1980s in which a cult of thieves devoted to Sarita Colonia is infiltrated by the police.

Murals have also been created in Colonia's likeness. A large painting of her was created in 1980 by the artist group E. P. S. Huayco on a canvas of 12,000 empty tin cans, which were placed on a hill frequented by migrants in Lima. This painting became another meeting point for devotees of Colonia to leave offerings. Another mural was featured in Milan, Italy, painted by two Peruvian students in 2017, though it was painted over in the following years. This mural was painted on the side of a railway embankment, on the border of an ethnically diverse neighborhood in the city.
