= San Baltasar =

- Venerated in: Folk Catholicism; Brotherhood of San Baltazar
- Feast: 6 January
- Attributes: Red robe and cape, crown, staff
- Patronage: Fernando de la Mora

San Baltasar, King Baltasar Cambá or San Baltazar is a folk saint of African origin, widely venerated in the coastal area of Argentina in the province of Corrientes, northeast of Santa Fe and east of Chaco and Formosa. The worship of San Baltasar is considered a para-liturgical cult, known as the Brotherhood of San Baltazar, since the Catholic Church has not canonized nor recognized Baltasar as a saint. San Baltasar appears as a crowned black man wearing a red robe or cloak and carrying a scepter or a staff.

San Baltasar's feast day is 6 January, when devotees dance and play music in his honor, most commonly candombe. In Concepción, Tucumán, Argentina, there are activities such as religious worship and musical entertainment offerings. This place, called the South Island of San Baltasar, is an architectural ensemble consisting of a church with the image of a saint. He is the unofficial patron saint of Fernando de la Mora, a town in Paraguay.

== See also ==
- Balthazar, one of the Three Wise Men.
