= Maria Beruski =

Brazilian school teacher

Saint Maria Beruski
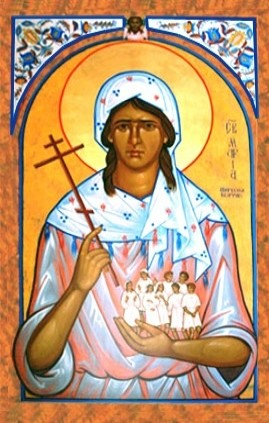
- Icon of St. Maria Beruski by Michel Qapeluk, 2006

Martyr of Joaquim Távora
- Born: c. 1959; Joaquim Távora, Paraná, Brazil
- Died: 4 April 1986 (aged 26–27); Joaquim Távora

Maria Aparecida Beruski, also known as Berushko (Note: Her ancestral Ukrainian name was Berushko, but it was derived as Beruski in Brazil. Posthumously, many prefer to address her by her ancestral surname.) (c. 1959 – 4 April 1986), was a school teacher who died saving her students in a school fire in Brazil. She may become the first Orthodox saint in Latin America.

== Life ==
Maria, being of Ukrainian descent, was born in 1959, in Joaquim Távora, Paraná, Brazil.

Beruski died in 1986, while teaching students at a small school in Joaquim Távora. When the school caught fire, Maria refused a chance to leave the building, instead she stayed inside and assisted her pupils in escaping. Beruski assisted in saving the lives of 5 students, but she along with 8 children died together in the fire.

== Legacy and veneration ==
In 2007, the Synod of the Ukrainian Orthodox Church in Latin America placed the issue of Maria's glorification to the Ecumenical Patriarchate. It was expected the final decision to be made within three years, but the Patriarchate later discarded the glorification.

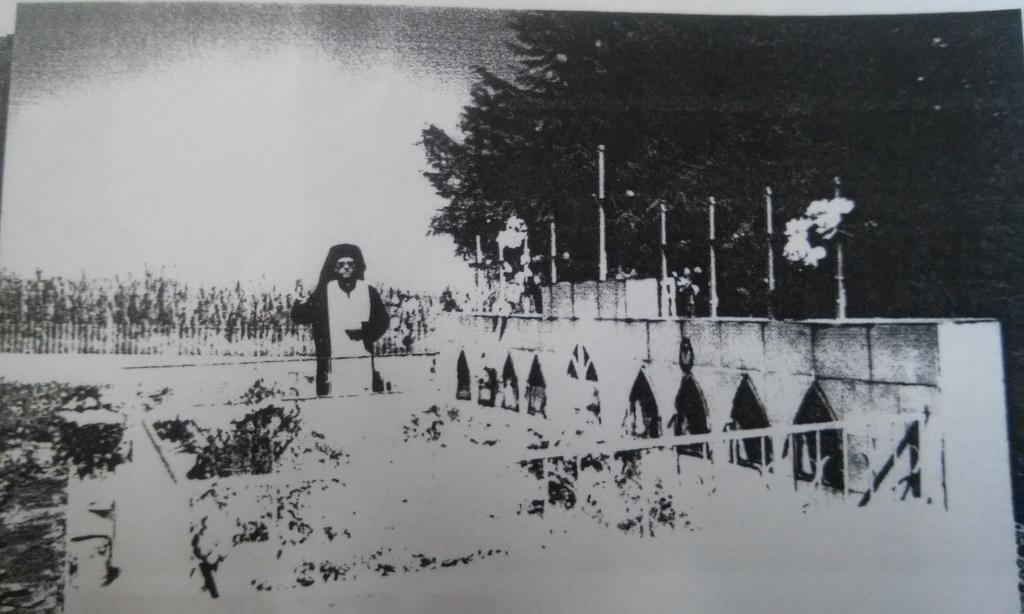
An Orthodox priest visiting the graves of Beruski and her 8 students

According to Bishop Jeremias Ferens of Ukrainian Orthodox Church, Beruski is regarded as a martyr and a miracle worker by devotees. A street in the Brazilian town of Curitiba has already been named after Beruski (Rua Maria Aparecida Beruski).
