= Anima Sola =

Figure in Folk Catholicism

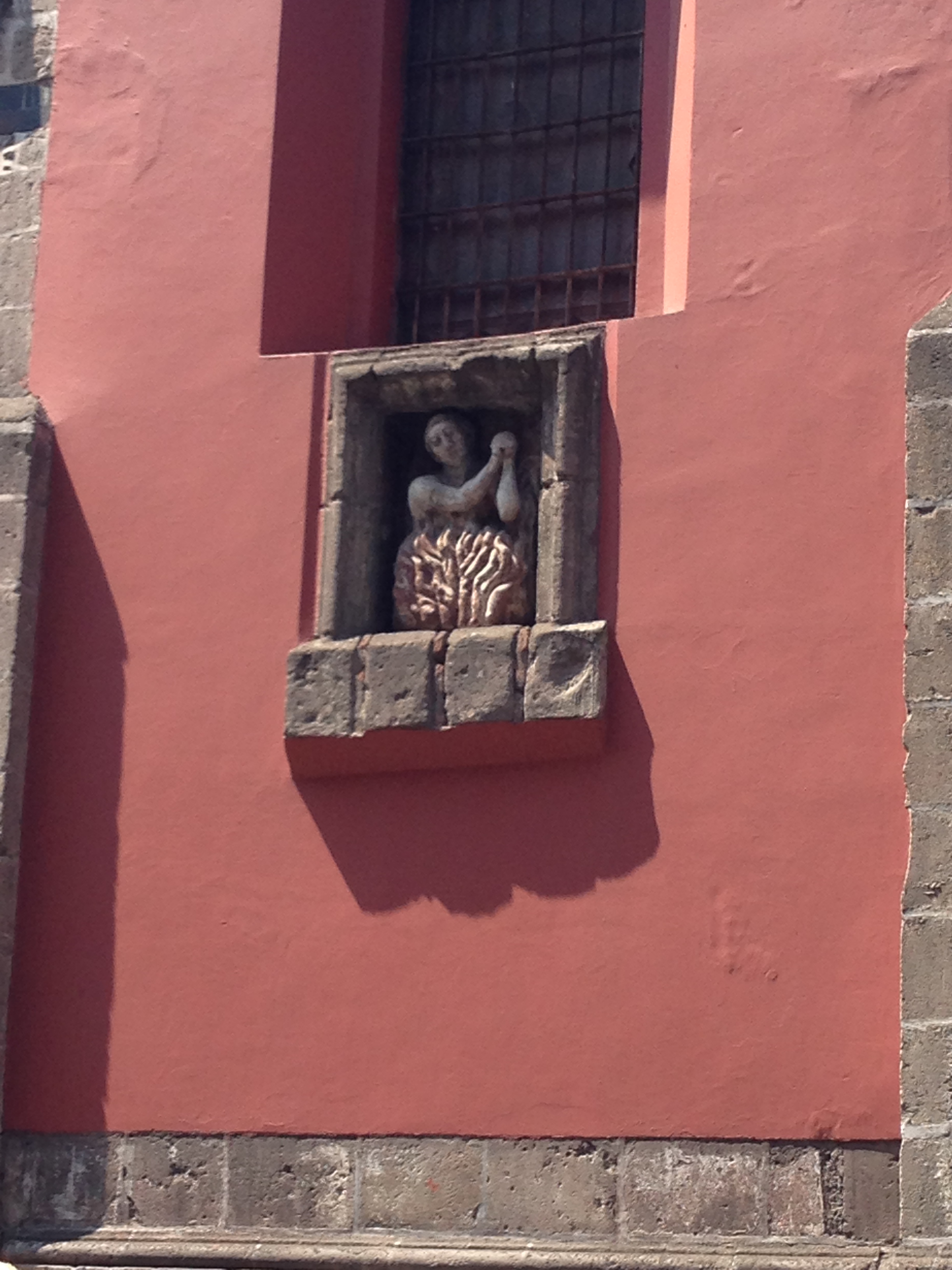
- The Anima Sola, a sculpture representation of this folk religion figure

Lonely Soul
- Venerated in: Catholic Church, Santeria, Haitian Vodou, Louisiana Voodoo, Dominican Vudu, Folk Catholicism
- Attributes: Soul in purgatory, flames, broken chains

Based on Catholic tradition, the Anima Sola or Lonely Soul is an image depicting a soul in purgatory, popular in Latin America as well as much of Andalusia, Naples, and Palermo.

== Brief history ==
While scholars have thus far not provided a history of the Anima Sola (or Ánimas del purgatorio in Spanish), the practice of praying for the souls in purgatory extends at least as far back as the Council of Trent in which the following was determined:

"Whereas the Catholic Church, instructed by the Holy Ghost, has from the Sacred Scriptures and the ancient tradition of the Fathers taught in Councils and very recently in this Ecumenical synod (Sess. VI, cap. XXX; Sess. XXII cap.ii, iii) that there is a purgatory, and that the souls therein are helped by the suffrages of the faithful, but principally by the acceptable Sacrifice of the Altar; the Holy Synod enjoins on the Bishops that they diligently endeavor to have the sound doctrine of the Fathers in Councils regarding purgatory everywhere taught and preached, held and believed by the faithful" (Denzinger, "Enchiridon", 983).

== Interpretations ==
The Anima Sola is taken to represent a soul suffering in purgatory. While in many cases chromolithographs depict a female soul, many other figures such as popes and other men are commonly depicted in chromolithographs, sculptures and paintings. In the most commonly known image of the Anima Sola, a woman is depicted as breaking free from her chains in a dungeon setting surrounded by flames, representing purgatory. She appears penitent and reverent, and her chains have been broken, an indication that, after her temporary suffering, she is destined for heaven.

Praying to the Anima Sola is a tradition in many ways unlike that of the more widespread cult of saints. In lieu of praying to a saint who then appeals to God, the Anima Sola represents souls in purgatory who require the assistance both of the living and the divine to ameliorate their sufferings in the afterlife.

The Anima Sola is common throughout much of the Catholic world, though is perhaps strongest in Naples, where it is referred to as "the cult of the souls in Purgatory." In Latin America, one source reports, the Anima Sola is "a belief still deeply rooted in the mass of the campesinos. The devotion dates from the first colonizers who probably brought the image in which the soul is represented as a woman suffering torments in purgatory with chains binding her hands.

== Celestina Abdenago ==
The female depicted is sometimes called Celestina, however the anima sola is usually anonymous. According to legend, at the crucifixion of Jesus on Good Friday there were many people present: among them, a woman by the name of Celestina Abdenago. Her task was to give the three condemned men a drink of water. Celestina gave Dismas and Gestas a drink from her jar but she refused to give one to Jesus (who was very thirsty) as she despised him or feared retaliation from the enemies of Jesus. For this reason she was condemned to suffer thirst and the constant heat of purgatory.

== The Male Anima Sola ==
AKA: "Juan Minero" or "Juan Loco" Sometimes an anonymous male figure is depicted as an anima sola, however the female soul was generally more common. Usually the male souls are shown as popes, priests or monks. In the cathedral of Guadalajara in Mexico there is a painting of a young monk or friar with a tonsure surrounded by flames and with a sad expression. According to tradition this young man was a priest who ended up in Purgatory because of his sinful life or because he absolved so many people at his last mass that he had to go to purgatory in their place. In any case, the image of a male soul suffering in purgatory became popular in Mexico and diverse places with reproductions being created and distributed among the faithful.

== Santería and Lukumi ==
In Santería or Lukumi, the Afro-Caribbean religion of Cuba, there is a syncretization of the Anima Sola with the Eshu Alleguana or Allegwana. The Eshus are divine messengers, tricksters, and masters of roads and doors that are necessary for all prayers to reach their intended point. Eshu Alleguana, one Eshu among hundreds, is thought to be the oldest of the Eshus and to have existed on Earth since a primordial time long before not only people, but before many of the gods of the religion existed in the world. Therefore, he is syncretized with the Lonely Spirit as many of the African gods were syncretized with Catholic saints or hidden behind them in the first centuries of slavery when traditional African religions were suppressed. The Anima Sola is grouped in a triad in some traditions with the Intranquil Spirit and the Dominant Spirit.
