= Leefdaal =

Coordinates: 50°51′N 4°35′E

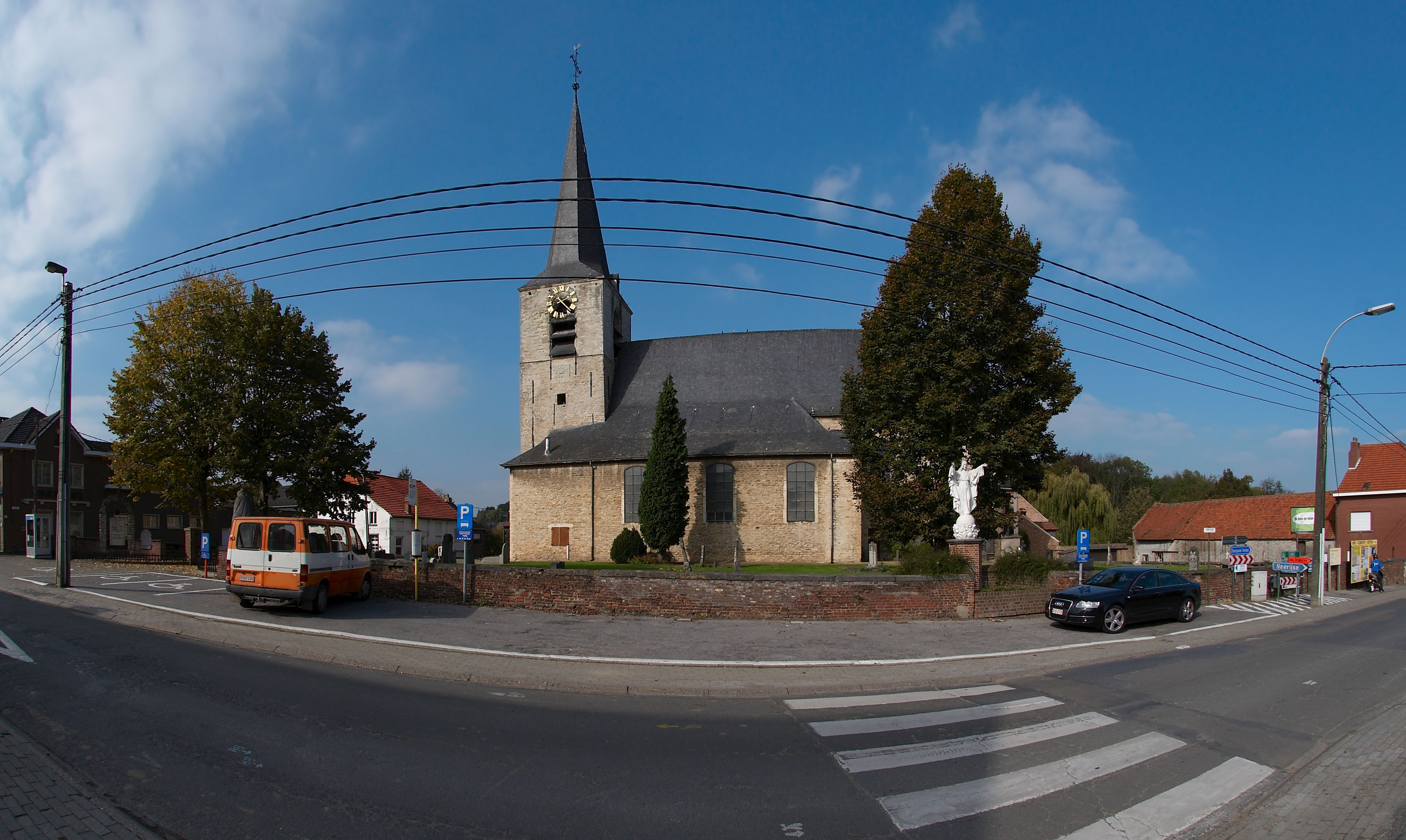
A church in Leefdaal

Leefdaal is a small town in central Belgium, in Flemish Brabant. It is part of the municipality of Bertem. Before 1977, it was one of the biggest villages in the region. Leefdaal features two medieval churches and a 17th-century castle.

== Notable people ==
- Hubertus (656–727), a local saint, died in Leefdaal;
- Verona of Leefdaal, a local folk saint whom tradition describes as having lived in the 9th century, gave her name to the medieval Sint-Verona chapel in Leefdaal;
- Jean de Brouchoven, 2nd Count of Bergeyck (1644–1725), 1st Baron of Leefdael, is buried in Leefdaal;
- Sanne Greet A. Putseys (born 1989), known as Selah Sue, singer-songwriter, was born in Leefdaal.

== Heritage ==
- Leefdaal Castle, residence of the House of Merode.

== Gallery ==
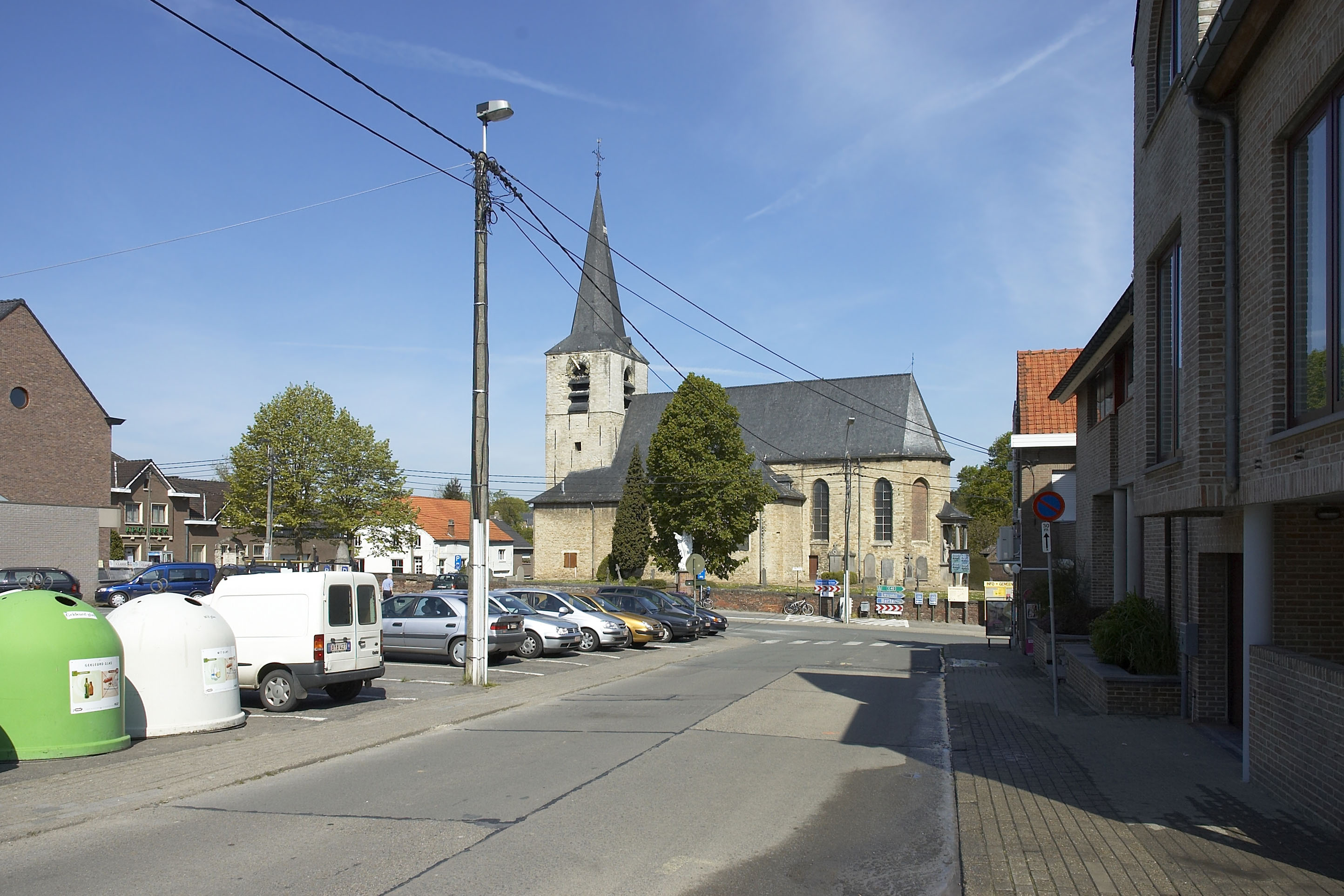
Leefdaal church

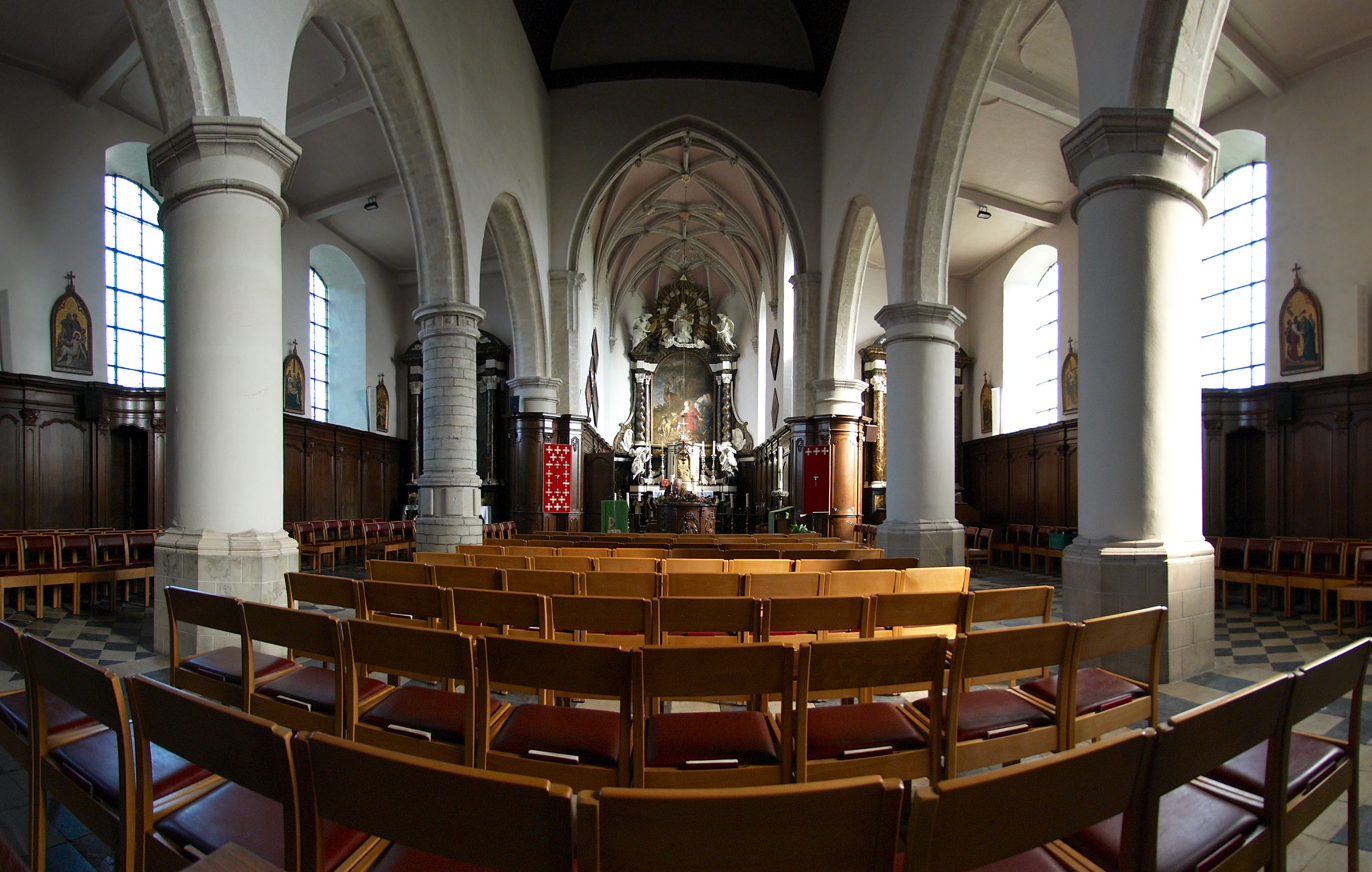
Leefdaal church inside

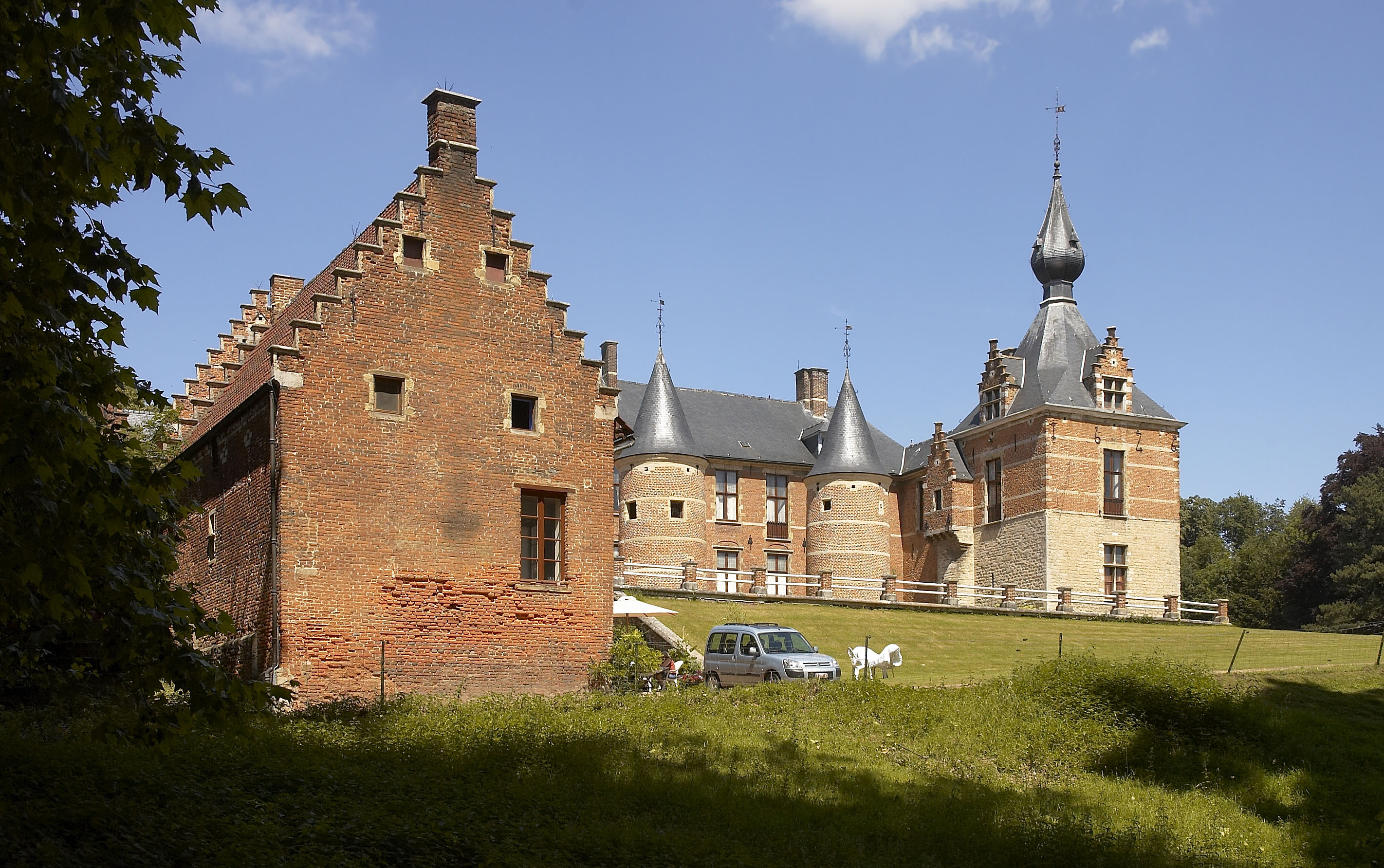
Leefdaal Castle

Arms

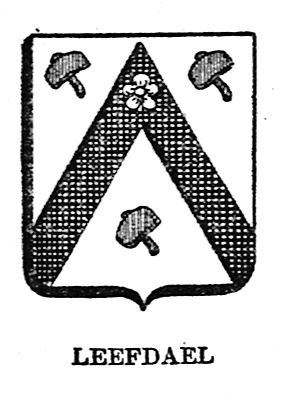
Noble House of Leefdael
