= Luisa Abano =

Filipino Catholic laywoman (1933–2006)

- Born: August 25, 1933; Cebu, Philippines
- Died: November 12, 2006 (aged 73); Talisay, Cebu, Philippines
- Known for: Incorruptibility
- Spouse: Felix Abano
- Children: 3

Luisa R. Abano (August 25, 1933 – November 12, 2006), popularly known as Nanay Loling, was a Filipino Catholic laywoman and faith healer.

Her remains were discovered as possibly incorrupt in May 2024 and since then was considered a local candidate for sainthood in Cebu. The Roman Catholic Archdiocese of Cebu has not released any official statement regarding the possibility of opening her beatification cause.

== Biography ==
Luisa was born on August 25, 1933, to a simple family. She was married to Felix Abano with whom she had three children: one son and two daughters.

=== Spirituality ===
She was remembered to be a devout Catholic who would always pray amidst the business of her time, finding means to support the family and rearing children. Luisa and Felix would wake up daily at 3 o'clock in the morning to pray the rosary and do devotional novenas to the Holy Cross and the Blessed Virgin.

As a faith healer, Luisa was known to generously take care and miraculously cure sick people who sought for her aid. She would recite continuously prayers in silence as she massages pains and applies holy oils on aching body parts of her patients. In cases of severe ailments, she would recommend religious devotions to gain miracles, and never ceases to visit the sick, asking 'Are you alright? Have you now recovered?'

=== Death ===
On November 12, 2006, Luisa died at the age of 73, after a long illness caused by her diabetes.

== Incorruptibility ==
On May 12, 2024, when Luisa's family were preparing to reuse her burial place for her husband who died on May 4, they were all surprised to discover her intact remains. According to her son Marcial Abano, Luisa's features "were perfectly preserved since she was buried", and no signs of decay nor foul smell emitted from the coffin. The family decided afterwards to leave her remains in the cemetery unless the church starts a proper investigation on her case.

When the reports of incorruptibility spread in Talisay, an increased belief and devotion among townspeople sprang that Luisa was a saint. People from neighboring towns, started visiting the Abanos and praying for miraculous intercessions through Luisa.

Fr. Jerome Secillano, spokesperson of the Catholic Bishops' Conference of the Philippines, professed that the Church has strict standards on declaring a person as candidate for sainthood. He explained regarding the numerous petitions to initiate the sainthood cause on Luisa that

"because the body is incorruptible, [he or she] is a saint immediately. No, it doesn't work that way. Many saints have already decayed, they may now be bones but they are saints. So the incorruptibility is not. It is necessary to see and examine first the kind of life lived, if it was holy, loved God and loved others. Now if that it is really incorrupt, the church will duly investigate that."
