= Joaquim Távora =

Coordinates: 23.4989°S 49.905°W

Joaquim Távora Joaquim Távora
- Municipality
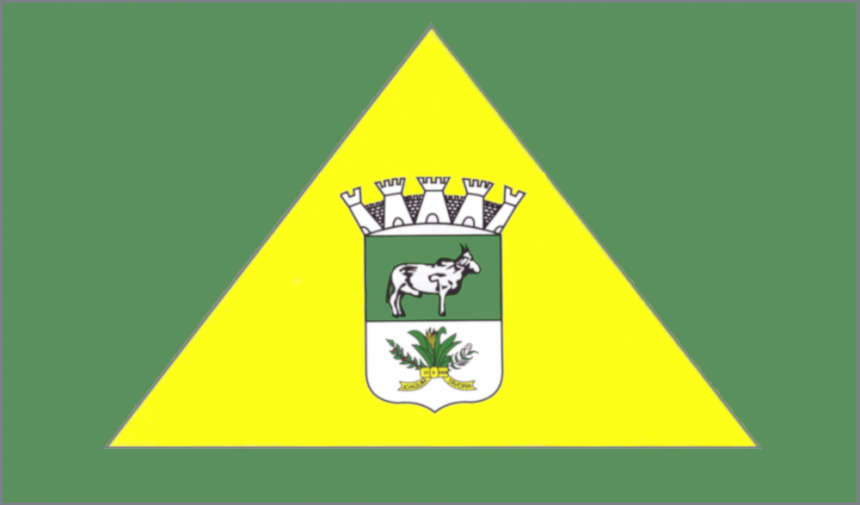
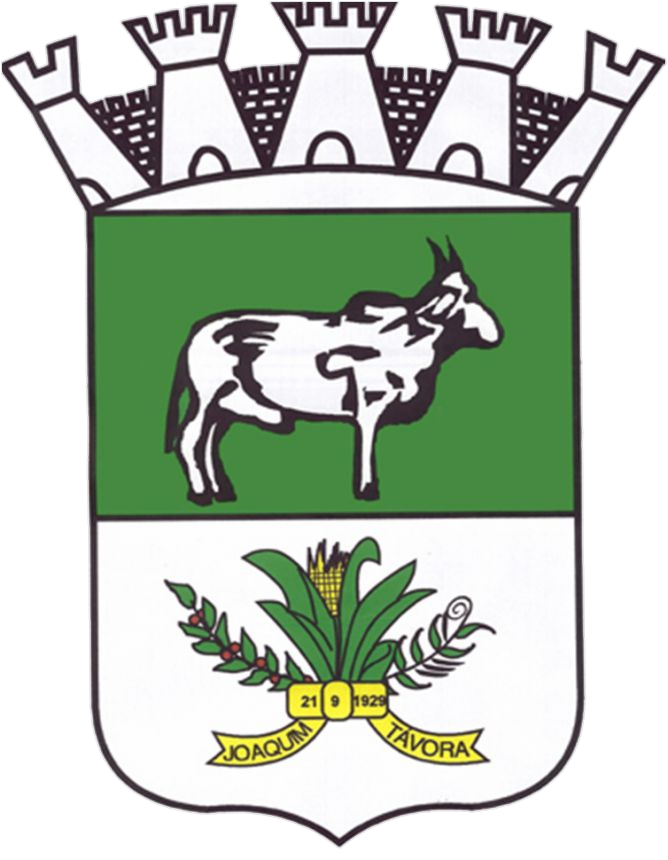
- Flag Coat of arms
- Interactive map of Joaquim Távora
- Country: Brazil
- Region: Southern
- State: Paraná
- Mesoregion: Norte Pioneiro Paranaense

Population (2020)
  - Total: 12,009
- Time zone: UTC−3 (BRT)

Joaquim Távora is a municipality in the state of Paraná in the Southern Region of Brazil.

== Climate ==
Climate data for Joaquim Távora, elevation 512 m (1,680 ft), (1972–2015)
Month	Jan	Feb	Mar	Apr	May	Jun	Jul	Aug	Sep	Oct	Nov	Dec	Year
Record high °C (°F)	37.8 (100.0)	38.4 (101.1)	37.8 (100.0)	35.0 (95.0)	32.6 (90.7)	31.8 (89.2)	33.4 (92.1)	35.0 (95.0)	37.6 (99.7)	37.0 (98.6)	39.2 (102.6)	38.4 (101.1)	39.2 (102.6)
Mean daily maximum °C (°F)	30.7 (87.3)	31.1 (88.0)	30.3 (86.5)	28.4 (83.1)	25.2 (77.4)	24.0 (75.2)	24.3 (75.7)	26.4 (79.5)	26.9 (80.4)	28.7 (83.7)	29.6 (85.3)	30.3 (86.5)	28.0 (82.4)
Daily mean °C (°F)	24.3 (75.7)	24.5 (76.1)	23.7 (74.7)	21.5 (70.7)	18.2 (64.8)	16.7 (62.1)	16.7 (62.1)	18.4 (65.1)	19.8 (67.6)	21.7 (71.1)	22.9 (73.2)	23.9 (75.0)	21.0 (69.9)
Mean daily minimum °C (°F)	19.9 (67.8)	20.0 (68.0)	19.2 (66.6)	16.8 (62.2)	13.5 (56.3)	11.6 (52.9)	11.3 (52.3)	12.5 (54.5)	14.6 (58.3)	16.8 (62.2)	18.0 (64.4)	19.3 (66.7)	16.1 (61.0)
Record low °C (°F)	11.8 (53.2)	13.4 (56.1)	7.0 (44.6)	2.4 (36.3)	0.0 (32.0)	−1.4 (29.5)	−5.4 (22.3)	−1.0 (30.2)	1.5 (34.7)	7.2 (45.0)	8.3 (46.9)	10.6 (51.1)	−5.4 (22.3)
Average precipitation mm (inches)	205.2 (8.08)	154.9 (6.10)	126.5 (4.98)	91.1 (3.59)	102.7 (4.04)	79.9 (3.15)	71.4 (2.81)	51.1 (2.01)	103.9 (4.09)	138.8 (5.46)	128.5 (5.06)	165.2 (6.50)	1,419.2 (55.87)
Average precipitation days (≥ 1.0 mm)	15	13	11	7	7	7	6	5	9	10	10	13	113
Average relative humidity (%)	75	75	75	74	76	77	72	66	67	69	69	73	72
Mean monthly sunshine hours	197.2	191.0	218.0	221.0	202.8	189.4	210.3	227.9	195.0	216.6	224.4	206.4	2,500
Source: IDR-Paraná

== See also ==
- Maria Beruski
- List of municipalities in Paraná
