= Chavanay =

- Commune
- Location of Chavanay
- Location within France Location within Auvergne-Rhône-Alpes
- Coordinates: 45°24′56″N 4°43′55″E
- Country: France
- Region: Auvergne-Rhône-Alpes
- Department: Loire
- Arrondissement: Saint-Étienne
- Canton: Le Pilat
- Intercommunality: Pilat rhodanien

Government
  - Mayor (2020–2026): Patrick Métral
- Area^{1}: 15.06 km^{2} (5.81 sq mi)
- Elevation: 160 m (520 ft)
- Highest elevation: 463 m (1,519 ft)
- Lowest elevation: 140 m (460 ft)
- Population (2023): 2,884
  - Density: 191.5/km^{2} (496.0/sq mi)
- Time zone: UTC+01:00 (CET)
  - Summer (DST): UTC+02:00 (CEST)
- INSEE/Postal code: 42056 /42410
- ^{1} French Land Register data, which excludes lakes, ponds, glaciers > 1 km^{2} (0.386 sq mi or 247 acres) and river estuaries.

Chavanay (French pronunciation: [ʃavanɛ]) is a commune in the Loire department in central France.

== Population ==
Historical population

Year	Pop.	±% p.a.
1793	1,815	—
1821	1,719	−0.19%
1846	1,809	+0.20%
1872	1,703	−0.23%
1901	1,708	+0.01%
1926	1,546	−0.40%
1946	1,510	−0.12%
1962	1,645	+0.54%
1968	1,710	+0.65%

Year	Pop.	±% p.a.
1975	1,666	−0.37%
1982	1,857	+1.56%
1990	2,071	+1.37%
1999	2,288	+1.11%
2007	2,734	+2.25%
2012	2,842	+0.78%
2017	2,885	+0.30%
2023	2,884	−0.01%

Source: EHESS and INSEE (1968-2023)

== Twin towns ==
Chavanay is twinned with Buchholz, Waldkirch, Germany, since 1994.

== See also ==
- Communes of the Loire department
