= Monte Alto, São Paulo =

Monte Alto
- Municipality
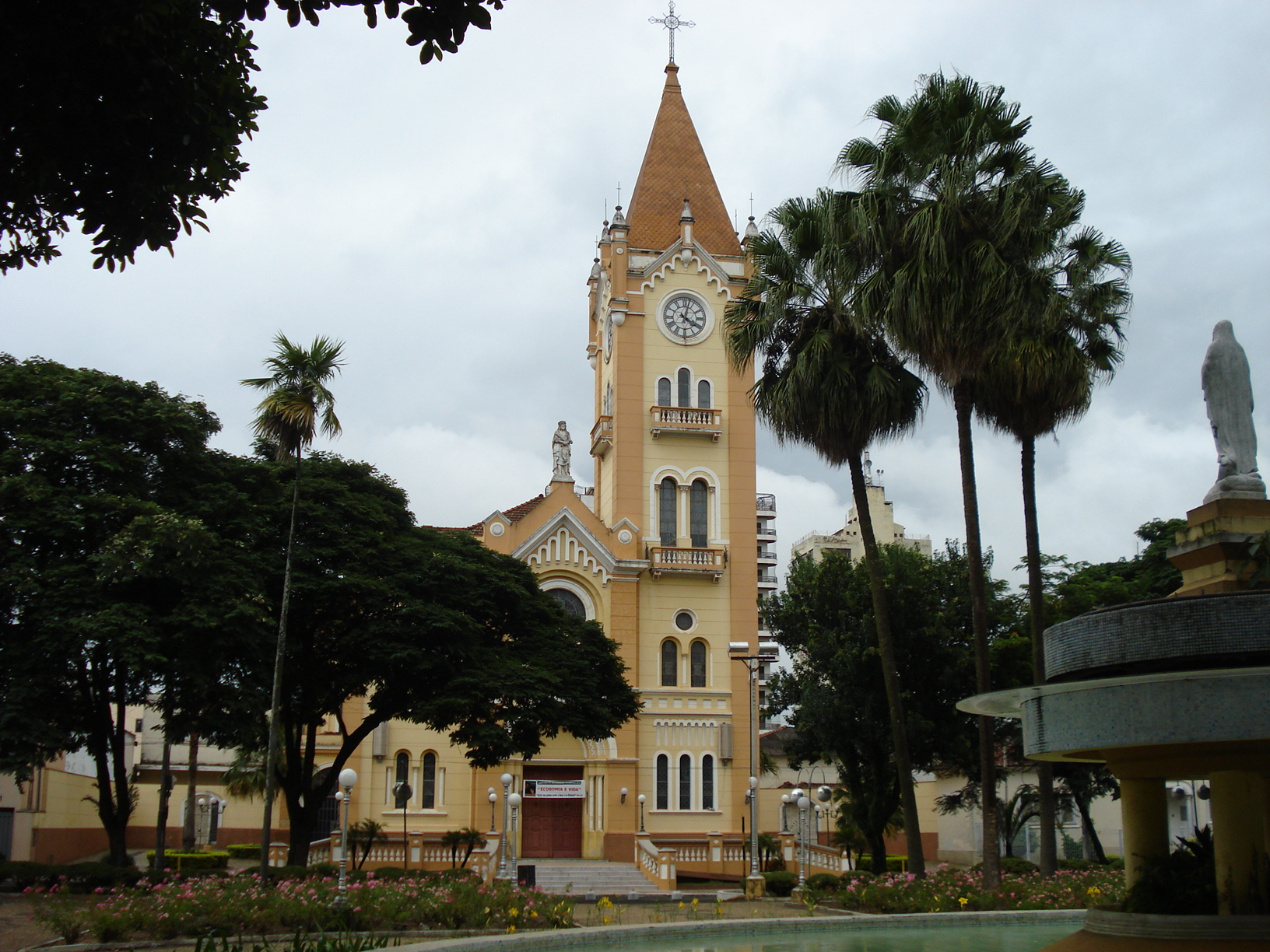
- Church in Monte Alto

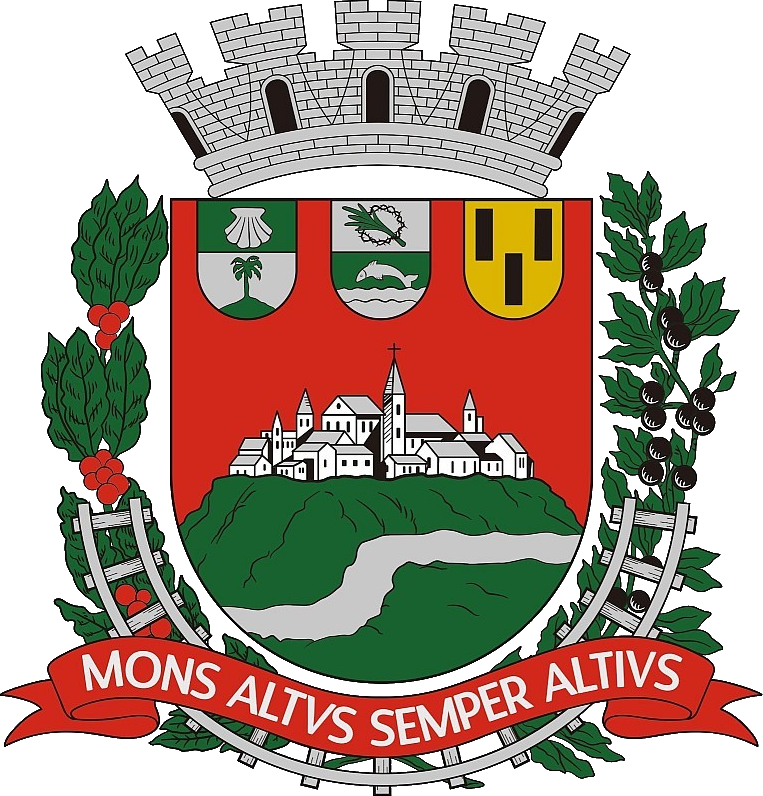
- Flag Coat of arms

- Location in São Paulo state

- Location in Brazil
- Coordinates: 21°15′40″S 48°29′47″W
- Country: Brazil
- Region: Southeast
- State: São Paulo

Area
  - Total: 347 km^{2} (134 sq mi)

Population (2020)
  - Total: 50,772
  - Density: 146/km^{2} (379/sq mi)
- Time zone: UTC−3 (BRT)

Monte Alto (Portuguese for "High Hill") is a municipality in the state of São Paulo in Brazil founded on May 15, 1881. The population is 50,772 (2020 est.) in an area of 347 km^{2} (134 sq mi). The elevation is 735 m. Its motto is (from Latin) Mons Altus Semper Altius (High Hill Always Higher). The sanctuary and mausoleum to the Brazilian popular saint, Menina Izildinha, is located in the city. And it's a birthplace for the professional football player, Vitor Bueno.

== Media ==
In telecommunications, the city was served by Telecomunicações de São Paulo. In July 1998, this company was acquired by Telefónica, which adopted the Vivo brand in 2012. The company is currently an operator of cell phones, fixed lines, internet (fiber optics/4G) and television (satellite and cable).

== Religion ==
Christianity is present in the city as follows:

=== Catholic Church ===
The Catholic church in the municipality is part of the Roman Catholic Diocese of Jaboticabal.

=== Protestant Church ===
The most diverse evangelical beliefs are present in the city, mainly Pentecostal, including the Assemblies of God in Brazil (the largest evangelical church in the country), Christian Congregation in Brazil, among others. These denominations are growing more and more throughout Brazil.

== See also ==
- List of municipalities in São Paulo
- Interior of São Paulo
