= Menina Izildinha =

Unofficial popular child saint

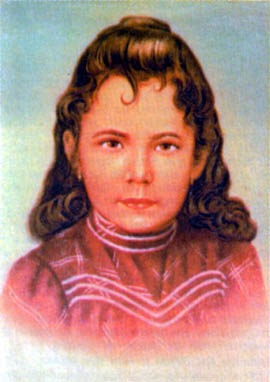
- Prayer card of Menina Izildinha

Mystic, Angel of the Lord, Angel of the Poor, Protector of Children
- Born: Maria Izilda de Castro Ribeiro; June 17, 1897; Póvoa de Lanhoso, Kingdom of Portugal
- Died: May 24, 1911 (aged 13); Guimarães, Portugal
- Venerated in: Folk Catholicism; Roman Catholicism in Brazil
- Major shrine: Sanctuary of Menina Izildinha, Monte Alto, São Paulo, Brazil
- Feast: June 17
- Attributes: Flowers
- Patronage: Children, adolescents, orphans, good health, social welfare, protection from harm, protection from diseases, people in poverty

Maria Izilda de Castro Ribeiro (June 17, 1897 – May 24, 1911) was a Portuguese girl to whom Brazilian Catholics have attributed inexplicable miracles, cures and healings.. She is popularly known as Menina Izildinha, Angel of the Lord or Saint Izildinha.

== History ==
=== Life and illness ===
Maria Izilda de Castro Ribeiro was born on June 17, 1897, in Póvoa de Lanhoso, northern Portugal to Aurélio Ribeiro and Ana Castro and one of the six children with five brothers: Constantino, José Bernardo, Antonio, Fernando and Júlio de Castro Ribeiro. She was baptized a Catholic on September 2, 1897, with Father João Duarte Macedo as her godfather and the Virgin Mary as her godmother, and made her Holy Communion in May 1904. She was described by her cousins, uncle and other family relatives as "cheerful and friendly" and was noted to enjoy playing the piano, completing her primary school at 11 and taking a strong devotion in angels and the Virgin Mary.

Maria Izilda's health greatly weakened near 1911 and she was diagnosed with leukemia. Her troubled family placed her in a separate room and noted that Maria accepted her suffering, never complaining of the pain, and was more worried of what would become of her family through their expenses. Before she died on May 24, 1911, in Guimarães, Portugal, barely 14 years old, she reportedly told her grandfather "Jesus is coming to take me".

=== Belief as a saint ===
Many years later, Maria's brother Fernando and his wife Rosa began to see visions of her through dreams following her death, resulting in many inexplicable miracles. On 1950, Fernando was reported that Maria Izilda appeared to him one night and told him to take her body to Brazil (where her brother Constantino lived and maintained a successful industrial center and food factory), so her relatives in Brazil agreed to relocate her body there from Portugal; a wish that the family wanted for a long time, though many of the villagers disagreed with this. On August 1, 1950, her body was removed from her grave and exhumed, but it was amazingly still found in perfect condition, 39 years after her death, as well as her clothes and even blooming flowers that adorned the coffin. The intact body stunned the local villagers, believing it to be a miracle of sorts and Izilda to be a popular saint, referring to her as Menina Izildinha, the "Angel of the Lord".

On March 8, 1958, the city organized a mass procession as the body of Maria Izilda arrived in Port of Santos, Brazil, and was heading to Monte Alto. Nearly 10,000 people crowded around the casket as it left the city chapel, carrying flowers, raising money for the funding of the mausoleum and even touching the coffin. The body is now preserved in a marble and bronze mausoleum, also acting as her sanctuary in the city of Monte Alto, São Paulo State, Brazil, which attracts many of her faithful devotees who come daily to ask for requests or thank her for her blessings and graces. Izildinha's body is kept in a lead coffin that cannot be admired: On 2004, former mausoleum administrator Luís Antônio Guimarães checked the coffin to perform repairs and discovered that her body remained in perfect condition, 93 years after her death, along with blooming red roses that mysteriously appeared around the body.

== Veneration ==
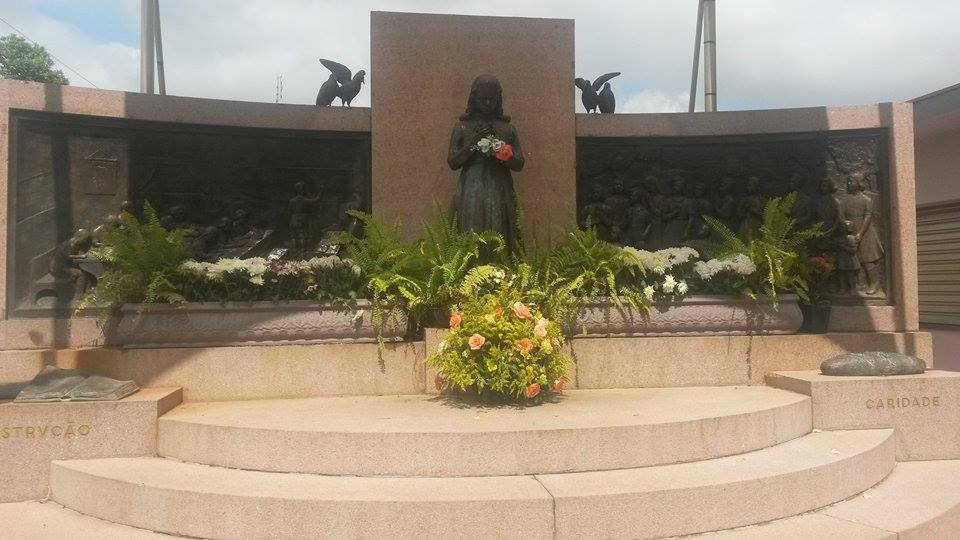
Sanctuary of Menina Izildinha in Monte Alto

The Sanctuary of Menina Izildinha (Portuguese: Santuario Menina Izildinha) located in Monte Alto, has become a center of faith and praise among the city inhabitants. Annually at the beginning of June (usually on the anniversary of Maria Izilda's birthday and lasting a few days), tens of thousands of devotees of Menina Izildinha make the pilgrimage to her mausoleum Monte Alto, where mass celebrations are organized to commemorate the birthday anniversary of Izildinha. The celebrations start with a procession in the city, saying novenas, praying the rosary, playing songs dedicated to Menina Izildinha and a feast whose income is directed to social works, charity institutions and orphanages.

Though Menina Izildinha is not recognized nor officially canonized as a saint by the Catholic Church, her devotees are not so concerned towards the Church's stance due to their great affection and demonstration towards Menina Izildinha; yet they desire that she be canonized a saint. Many members of the Catholic Church in Brazil have approved of the phenomenon as a saint and encouraged in practicing devotions to Menina Izildinha.

Menina Izildinha is the patroness and the protector of young children and adolescents. She allegedly performed a miracle to heal the sick from disease and to help people in poverty.
