= Nelson Santana =

Brazilian Venerable (1955–1964)

Venerable Nelson Santana
- Born: 31 July 1955; Ibitinga, São Paulo, Brazil
- Died: 24 December 1964 (aged 9); Araraquara, São Paulo, Brazil
- Cause of death: Bone cancer

Nelson Santana, also called "Nelsinho" (31 July 1955 – 24 December 1964), was a Brazilian boy who died of osteosarcoma. He came to be widely venerated in his hometown Ibitinga, and Pope Francis recognized his heroic virtue in 2019 and declared him venerable.

== Life ==
Santana was born on 31 July 1955 to João Joaquim Santana and Ocrézia Aparecida Santana at Ronca Farm in Ibitinga. The third of eight children in a poor and deeply religious family, Santana was baptized on 1 October 1955. From a young age, his parents gave him religious instruction and he attended school on the farm where he lived.

When he was about seven years old, Santana fell from a tree, seriously injuring his left shoulder, and was hospitalized at the Holy House of Araraquara. To cover medical expenses, his parents sold many of their possessions. While hospitalized, Santana received love and support from doctors, nurses, and other patients. One nun, Sister Genarina Gecchele of the Congregation of the Apostles of the Sacred Heart of Jesus, believed Santana was especially pure and took it upon herself to catechize him. On 15 June 1964, Santana received his first communion in the hospital chapel.

When osteosarcoma was discovered in Santana's left arm, the only solution presented by the doctors was amputation. When Santana was informed by Sr. Genarina Gecchele of the pending amputation, he did not complain and believed the pain in his arm helped him better understand the suffering of Jesus. Santana was very devoted to Catholic teaching and kissed the crucifix to distract himself from the pain. He believed that he would die at Christmas time, and is believed to have predicted the date of his death. On Christmas Eve of 1964, Santana died at the age of nine as a result of infections caused by the amputation.

== Burial and legacy ==
=== Burial ===
When Santana died, his family could not afford a funeral for him. His body was buried as a pauper at the cemetery of St. Benedict in Araraquara. Later, a grave at São Bento Cemetery was donated to his family. Santana's grave attracts many devotees and visitors, and is often covered in flowers and candles. Santana's remains were exhumed on 24 October 2011 and transferred to the Senhor Bom Jesus parish in Ibitinga, and placed in a crypt in the Mother Church of Senhor Bom Jesus.

=== Beatification process ===
Santana's life has attracted much veneration, and in 2012 the Vatican started investigating his life after it obtained evidence for beatification. Father Gerhard Rudolfo Anderer, a priest who visited Santana in the hospital, wrote a book called Nelsinho para Todos (Note: translation: Nelsinho for Everybody) and started Santana's cause for beatification. The following year, the commission that investigated Santana's life declared that there was not enough medical evidence of the miracles attributed to Santana. One miracle attributed to Santana was Vítor da Silva Leitão's recovery from macrocephaly. According to the child's family, they received a copy of Santana's death certificate and asked for intercession. On 8 April 2019, Pope Francis recognized Santana's heroic virtue and declared him venerable.
