= Villanueva de la Reina =

Villanueva de la Reina, Spain
- city
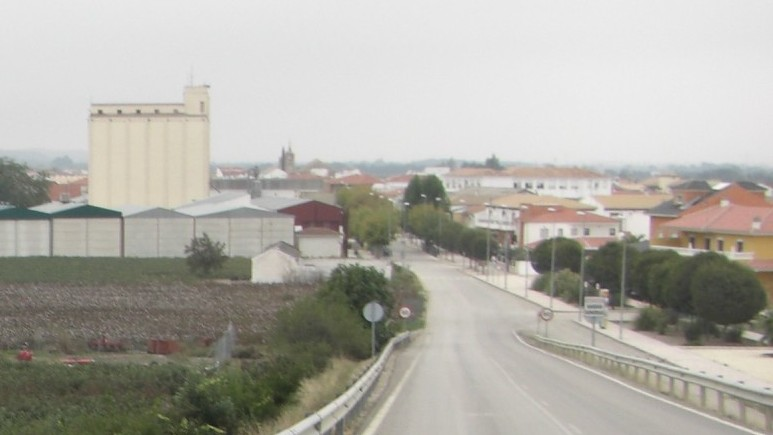

- Flag Coat of arms

- Location in the Province of Jaén Villanueva de la Reina (Andalusia) Villanueva de la Reina (Spain)
- Coordinates: 38°00′N 3°55′W
- Country: Spain
- Autonomous community: Andalusia
- Province: Jaén
- Municipality: Villanueva de la Reina

Area
  - Total: 209 km^{2} (81 sq mi)
- Elevation: 221 m (725 ft)

Population (2025-01-01)
  - Total: 2,941
  - Density: 14.1/km^{2} (36.4/sq mi)
- Time zone: UTC+1 (CET)
  - Summer (DST): UTC+2 (CEST)

Villanueva de la Reina is a town located in the province of Jaén, Spain. According to the 2005 census (INE), the town has a population of 3352 inhabitants.

It was named after Queen Isabella II of Spain as a reward for the aid it received from the monarch. After independence in 1812, it was called Villanueva del Río, but in 1862 it received its current name in her honor.

== See also ==
- List of municipalities in Jaén
