= Pierre Véron (lawyer) =

French lawyer (born 1947)

- Born: 20 July 1947 (age 79); Roanne, Loire, France
- Occupation: Patent lawyer

Pierre Véron (born 20 July 1947) is a French lawyer and specialist in the field of patent litigation.

== Professional career ==
After his call to the Bar in 1969, Véron founded, in 1971, the business law firm Lamy, Véron, Ribeyre & Associés in Lyon, France. Véron joined the Paris Bar in 1996. In 2001, he established Véron & Associés in Paris and Lyon, a law firm devoted exclusively to the practice of patent litigation. Véron’s experience in cases involving large French and international entities led him to be the first to appear before a French court to plead cases relating to a European patent (1990), a nanotechnology patent (2003) and the infringement of a molecular biology patent (2007). Since 2007, Véron has served as an expert with the European Commission for projects involving the European Union patent court. In 2010 and 2019, he was featured as the Lawyer of the Year for France in the American publication Best Lawyers, in the Practice Area of Intellectual Property Litigation. Since 2006, he has been featured as one of the most highly regarded patent lawyers in the world in the Who's Who Legal ranking.

== Professional associations ==
- President of the FNUJA (Fédération Nationale des Unions de Jeunes Avocats, translation: National Federation of Young Lawyers’ Unions) 1977–1978
- Member of the Council of the Ordre des Avocats (translation: the Order of Lawyers) (Lyon, France) 1975–1978
- Member of the CCBE (Council of Bars and Law Societies of Europe) 1979–1982
- President of the AAPI (Association des Avocats de Propriété Industrielle, translation: Association of Industrial Property Lawyers) 1998–2002
- Founder and president of EPLAW (European Patent Lawyers Association) 2001–2004

== Publications ==
- Saisie-contrefaçon (direction), Dalloz Référence, 3rd edition 2013-2014 (ISBN 978-2247091102)
- Saisie-contrefaçon, trilingual edition, 2015
- Concise International and European Intellectual Property Law (direction, in collaboration with Thomas Cottier), Kluwer Law International, 2nd edition 2011 (ISBN 978-9-041-13420-2), Kluwer Law International, 3rd edition 2015 (ISBN 978-9041152305).
