= Jan Willems =

Jan Willems is a Dutch language name. It may refer to:

- Jan Willems (fl 1520 – 1547/1548), a Flemish painter
- Jan Willems (died 1688), a Dutch buccaneer
