= Convent of Saint Dorothea =

Augustinian convent in Burgos, Spain

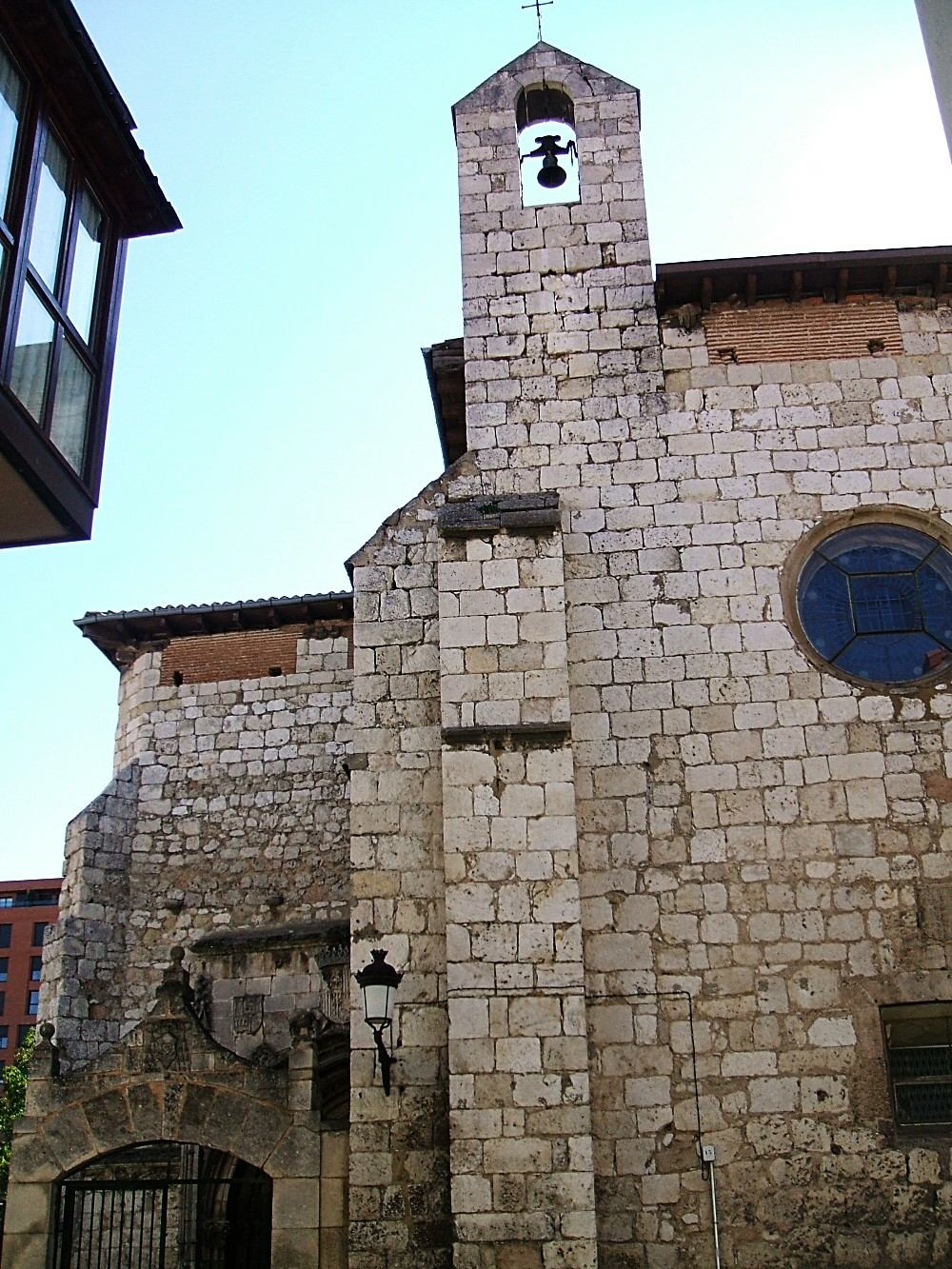
Convent of Saint Dorothea

The Convent of Saint Dorothea (Spanish: Convento de Santa Dorotea) is an Augustinian convent in the city of Burgos, Spain. It was built in the 15th century.

An earlier convent had been established in the city by Dorotea Rodríguez Valderrama in 1387. The Augustinian Rule was adopted in 1429. The present location was chosen in 1470 and the church's construction and endowment was supported by King John II of Castile and Juan de Ortega, bishop of Almería.
