= Josse van der Baren =

Flemish painter

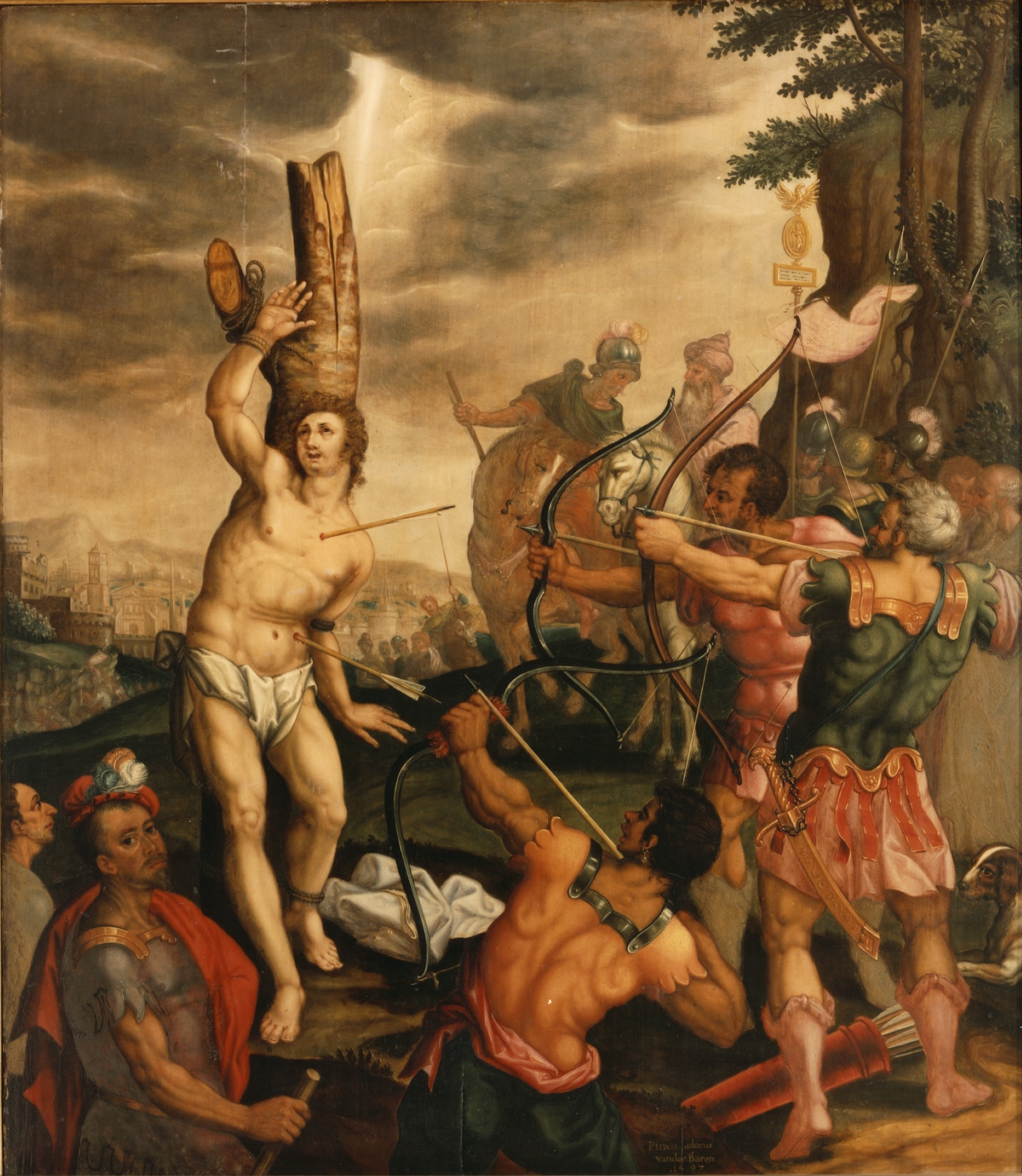
The Martyrdom of Saint Sebastian, central panel

Josse van der Baren (variations on the first name: 'Joost' and 'Jodocus') (b. between 1540 and 1560 – d. between 1604 and 1624) was a Flemish painter of history paintings and a draughtsman active in the Leuven area around the turn of the 17th century.

== Life ==
Josse van der Baren was born and died in Leuven. It is not clear with whom he trained. It is not known whether he visited Italy although his work is clearly influenced by Italian art. He was mainly active in the Leuven region and that is why most of his works are still found in that area.

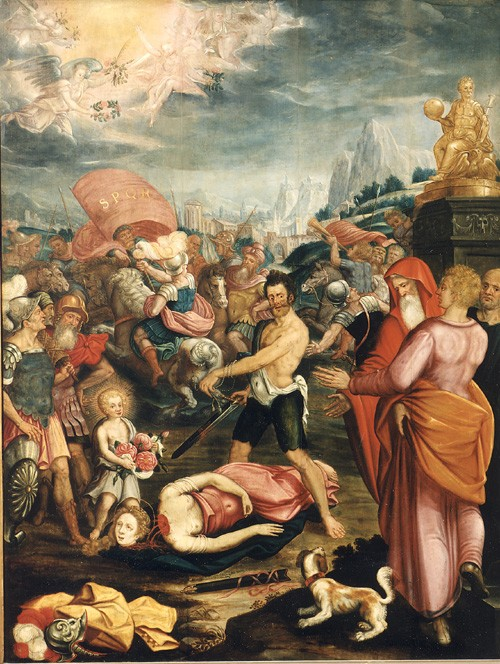
The Martyrdom of Saint Dorothea, central panel

Van der Baren was an active participant in Leuven's rhetorician circles, which were responsible for the production of theatre performances. His brother held the leading position of the prince in the local chamber of rhetoric De Roos (The Rose). Josse van der Baren was a friend of Justus Lipsius (1547-1606), the eminent philologist and humanist who resided and taught in Leuven. Lipsius composed the epitath on the tombstone of the five-year-old son of van Baren who died in 1605.

== Work ==
=== Painting ===
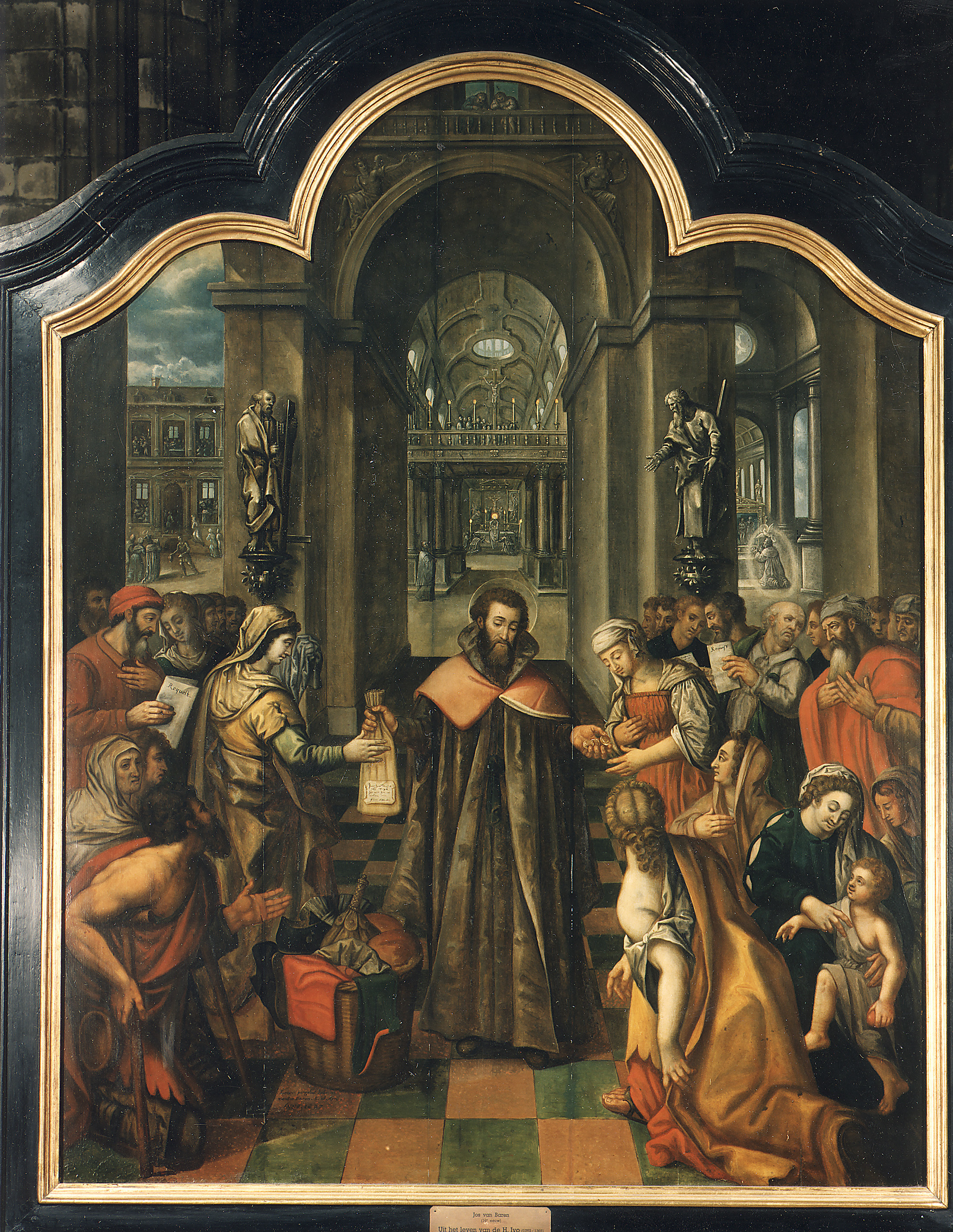
The St Ivo Triptych, central panel

Josse van der Baren mainly painted religious altarpieces on panel. His work is preserved in and near Leuven, including in Leuven's St Peter's Church, the Park Abbey in Heverlee and the St Laurentius Church in Veltem. At the time, many Flemish artists such as Michiel Coxie and Frans Floris painted in an Italianizing style and van der Baren's work was clearly influenced by this movement.

His masterpiece is the Martyrdom of St. Sebastian (M - Museum Leuven). It was originally a triptych of which now only the central panel has been preserved. Other works by his hand are the Martyrdom of Saint Dorothea and the St Ivo Triptych both painted for Leuven's St. Peter's Church. The Martyrdom of Saint Dorothea was commissioned by the local chamber of rhetoric De Roos for its chapel in the St. Peter's Church in Leuven. Saint Dorothea was the patron saint of the chamber of rhetoric De Roos since roses play an important role in the saint's legend. The frontal view of the triptych depicts the martyrdom of Saint Dorothea in a style which is reminiscent of Michiel Coxie. The paintings on the reverse side of the triptych reveal the originality of van der Baren. The reverse side shows architectural frames with views of Leuven and cartouches with rose garlands. Two poems are painted in trompe-l'œil on illusionistic paper sheets. The St Ivo Triptych was commissioned by the law faculty of the Old University of Leuven. The central panel depicts Ivo of Kermartin as the advocate of the poor who gives alms.

A badly damaged Mater Dolorosa painted in grisaille on the reverse side of a panel of the Virgin attributed to the Master of Flémalle (Städel Museum, Frankfurt am Main) has been attributed to van der Baren. The painting represents the grieving Mary with a sword through her heart.

=== Drawing ===
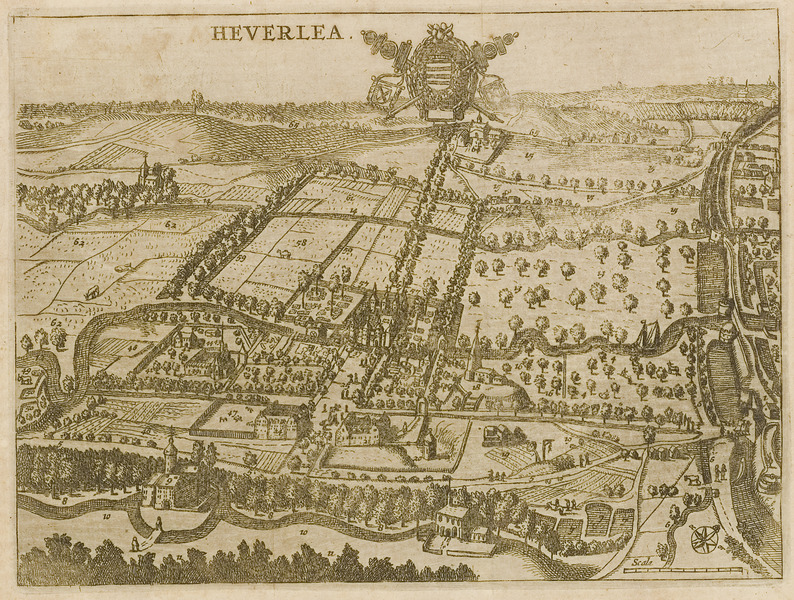
Panorama of Heverlee

Van der Baren's landscape drawings were the basis for several engravings. His panoramas of Leuven and Heverlee were engraved and printed in Justus Lipsius’ 1605 Lovanium, a history of the Duchy of Brabant. The original panoramic drawing of Heverlee may have been made at the request of the aristocrat Charles III de Croÿ who had an extensive manuscript collection and had significant land holdings in Heverlee. Justus Lipsius wished to convince Charles III de Croÿ to move his library to Heverlee and establish a humanist academy. Lipsius asked van der Baren to indicate the location of this planned academy in his panorama. The plate of the panorama of Leuven was engraved by Pieter van der Borcht (I) and further processed by Theodoor Galle.
