= Scenes from the Life and Martyrdom of Saints Catherine and Clement (Jan Rombouts) =

Painting by Jan Rombouts the Elder

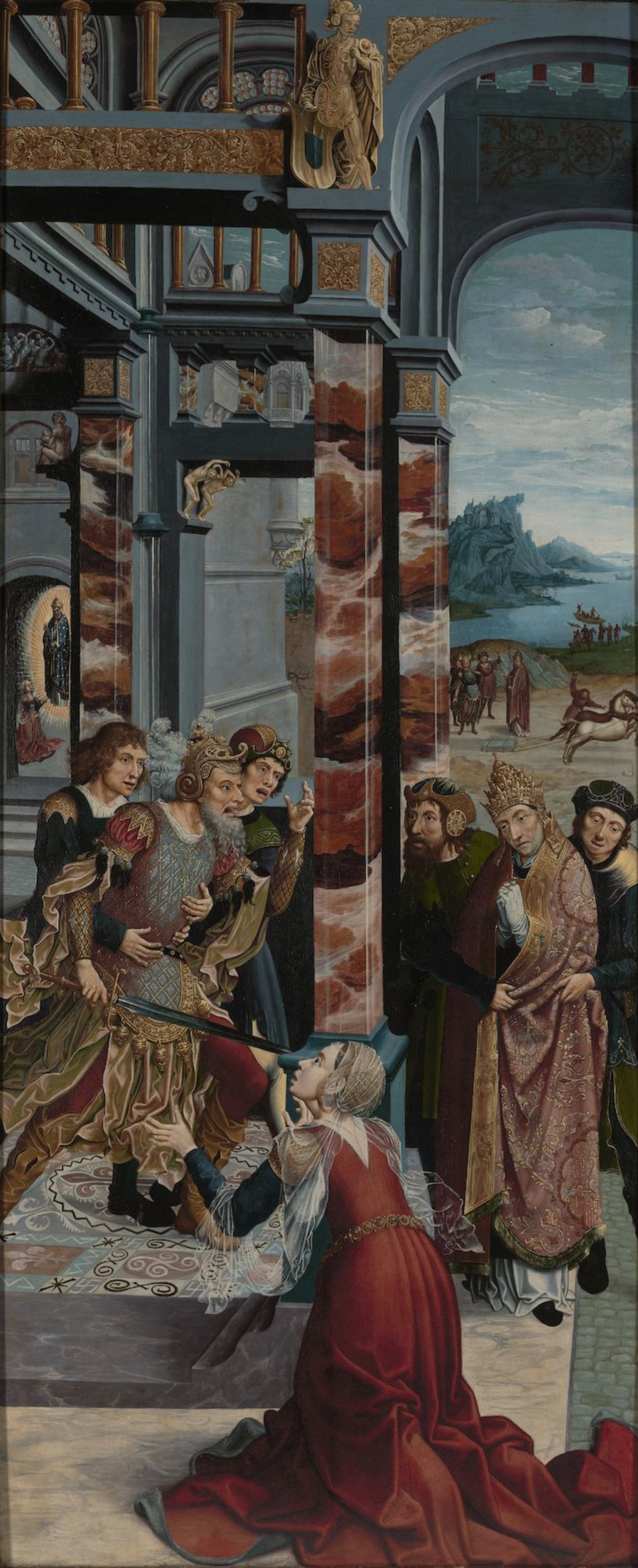
Scenes from the Life and Martyrdom of St. Catharine

Scenes from the Life and Martyrdom of Saints Catherine and Clement are panels, painted on both sides, with depictions from the life of Saints Catherine and Clement on the inside and grisaille paintings on the outside. They are located in the Saint Peter's Church in Leuven, Belgium. They are the work of the Leuven painter Jan Rombouts the Elder and his workshop and likely created sometime between 1525 and 1535. The dimensions of the panels are about 167 cm high and 70 cm in width. It is not known whether the panels were originally attached to a central painted panel or to a sculpted retable.

== Scenes from the Life and Martyrdom of St. Catherine ==
This double-sided painted panel, with representations from the life of Saint Catherine on the inside and a cross in grisaille on the outside, was made between 1525 and 1535. Around the 19th century the grisaille scenes were covered with a red layer of paint. During the restoration, that layer was removed and various fragments of the grisailles are now visible again. The Scenes from the Life and Martyrdom of St. Catherine was the left-hand side panel of the altarpiece.

The front of the panel tells stories from the life and martyrdom of Catharine as told in the Legenda Aurea. Catharine refused to marry the pagan emperor Maxentius, since she believed she was already mystically betrothed to Christ. Maxentius then sentenced her to death by torture. The instruments of torture were destroyed by lightning from heaven. Even so Catharine died as a martyr by decapitation. Catharine is depicted kneeling down praying in the foreground of the painting, waiting for the final blow. The destruction of the instruments of torture is depicted in the background. On the far left angels carry her body to Mount Sinai.

== Scenes from the Life and Martyrdom of St. Clement ==
This work was also made between 1525 and 1535 and is the right-hand side panel of the altarpiece. The inside tells several scenes from the life of Saint Clement. These scenes were rarely depicted in paintings, but were described in the Legenda Aurea. Clement Romanus was Peter's third successor and was pope from 92 to 101 AD. He converted many people, including Theodora, the wife of the pagan Sisinnius. Legend has it that Sisinnius secretly followed his wife to the church where Clement preached. When he entered the building, he immediately lost his eyesight and hearing.

Theodora asked Clement to help her husband who then healed him through prayer. He had Clement arrested immediately for sorcery, which is shown in the centre of the panel. Clement is arrested, Sisinnius furiously raises his sword and Theodora tries to calm down her husband. Legend has it that after Clement's arrest, Saint Peter appeared to Theodora. This story is retold in the background on the left. On the right-hand side of the panel is depicted how Clement was exiled a few years later by Emperor Trajan to an island in the Pontus, where many Christians were employed in the marble quarries. It is on that island that Clement was thrown into the sea with an anchor around his neck upon Trajan's orders.
