= M – Museum Leuven =

Art museum in Leuven, Belgium

Coordinates: 50.8789°N 4.7044°E

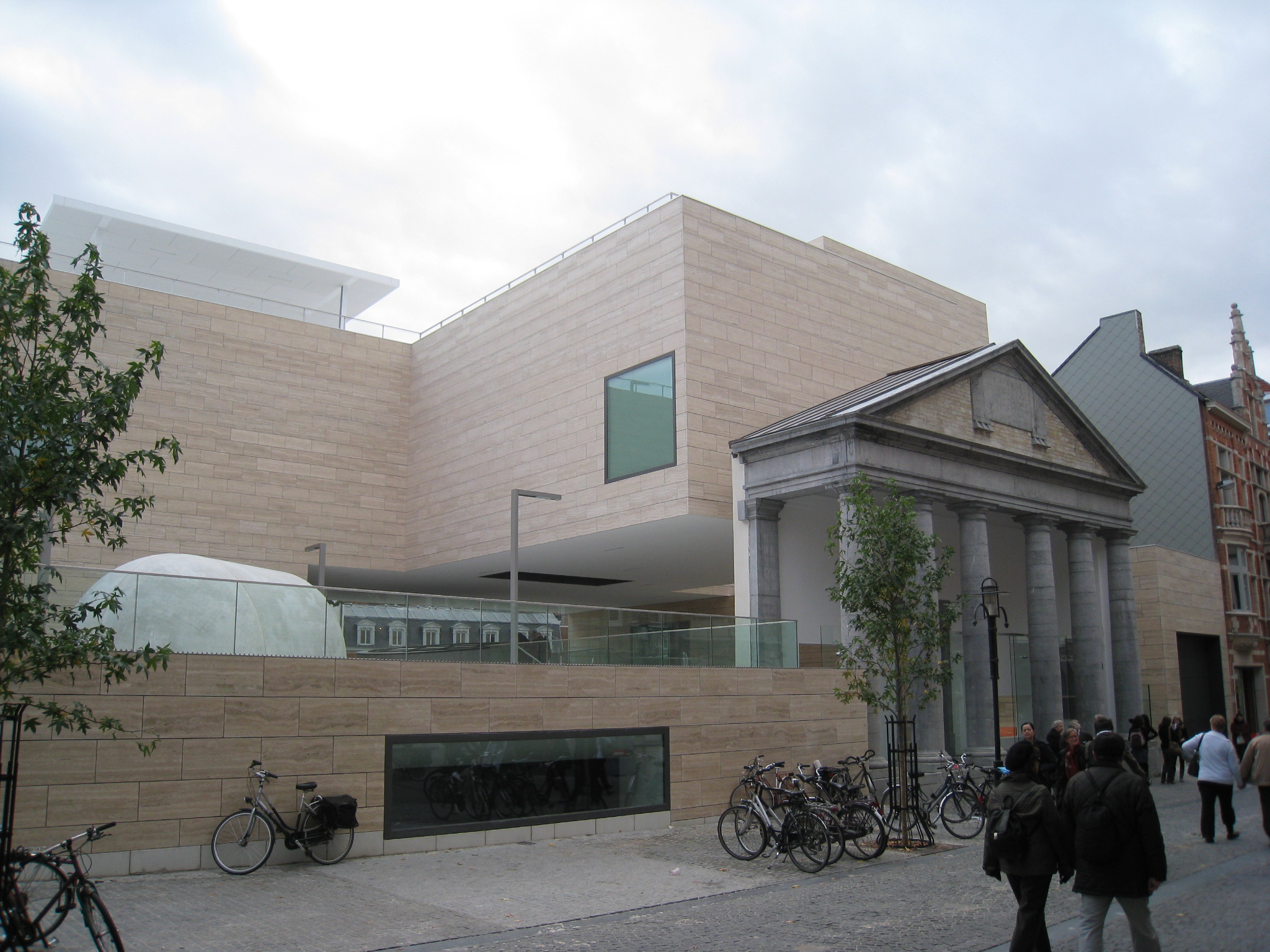
M – Museum Leuven

M Leuven or simply M is an art museum in the inner city of Leuven, Belgium, which was officially opened in 2009. The museum has a collection of some 46,000 works, which range from late-Gothic paintings and sculptures to 16th century local artists such as Jan Rombouts the Elder and Josse van der Baren to 19th-century paintings and sculptures by various Flemish masters including Constantin Meunier, Jef Lambeaux and George Minne.

== History ==
M Leuven continues the municipal museum operations that started in the early 19th century. In 1823, the first museum was founded on the second floor of the Leuven City Hall. About one century later, the collection was moved to the former private residence of the mayor Leopold Vander Kelen in the historic center of Leuven. This location is now the principal exhibition space of M Leuven.

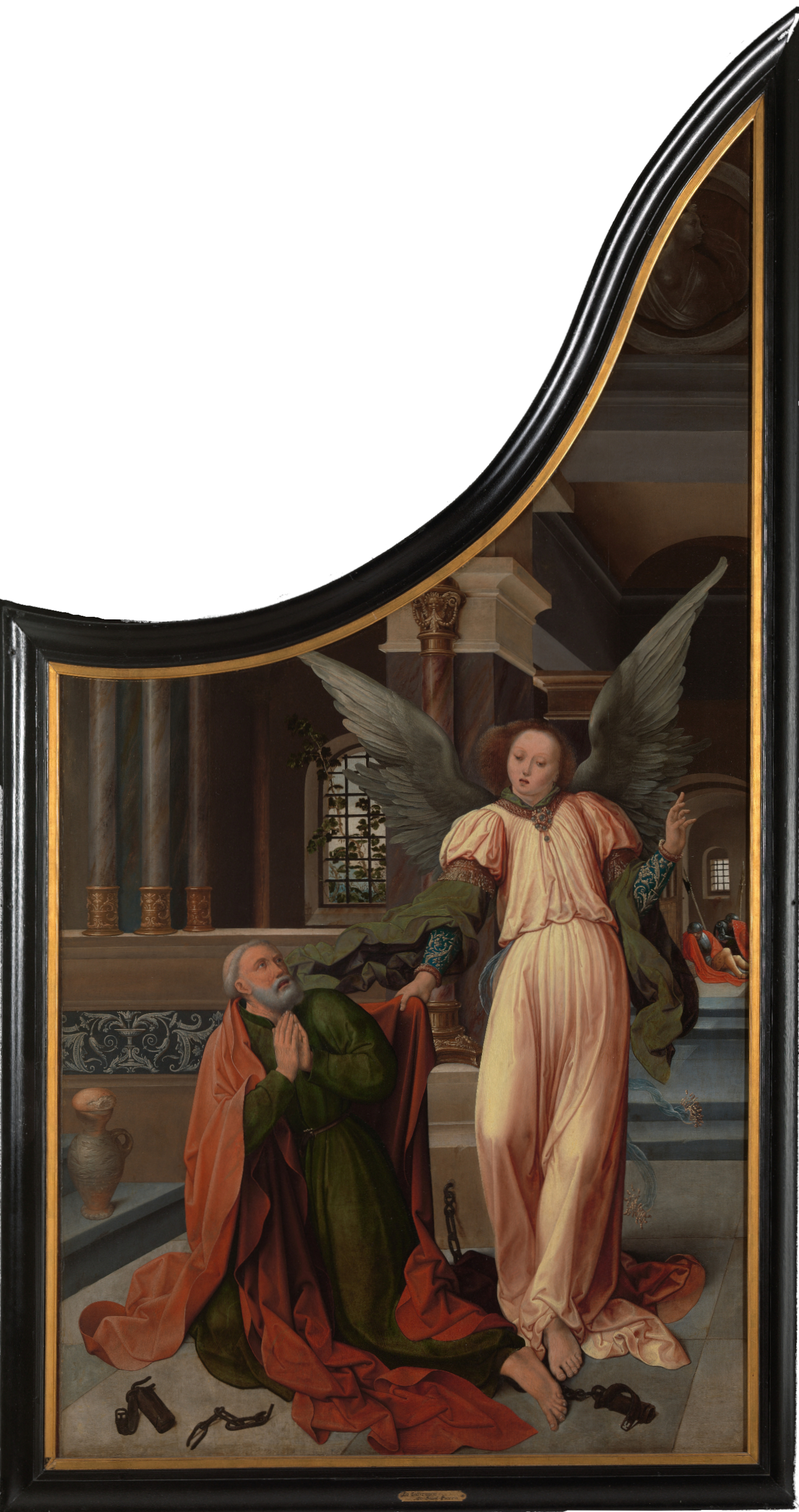
The Liberation of Saint Peter by Jan Rombouts at M

Before it was opened in 2009, the M Museum building was renovated after a design by Belgian architect Stéphane Beel. The design integrates historical features and sleek contemporary architecture around a pretty courtyard. The total area of the museum is 13,500 square meters.

In addition to its exhibition space, the museum building houses the M-café, the M-shop, an auditorium, a children's workshop, a courtyard and workshop spaces.

== Permanent collection and exhibitions ==
M Leuven manages the art collection, which is the property of the city of Leuven. This collection has grown from what originally was an 18th-century room of curiosities. Through gifts, the art collection grew into a full-fledged collection offering an overview of the art production in Leuven and Brabant from the Middle Ages to the present.

The historical collection of M has as its core paintings and objects from the late Gothic period (15th and 16th century) and a collection of 19th century paintings. The M collection includes masterpieces by Dirk Bouts, Rogier van der Weyden, Constantin Meunier, Jef Lambeaux and others. M is also a platform for discovering contemporary art as the collection includes painting, sculpture, photography, video, film and architecture.

The museum organises many activities throughout the year such as themed exhibitions, family Sundays, children's workshops, tours, lectures, book presentations and framework of the exhibition offer.
