= Saint Quentin's Church =

Roman Catholic Church in Leuven, Belgium

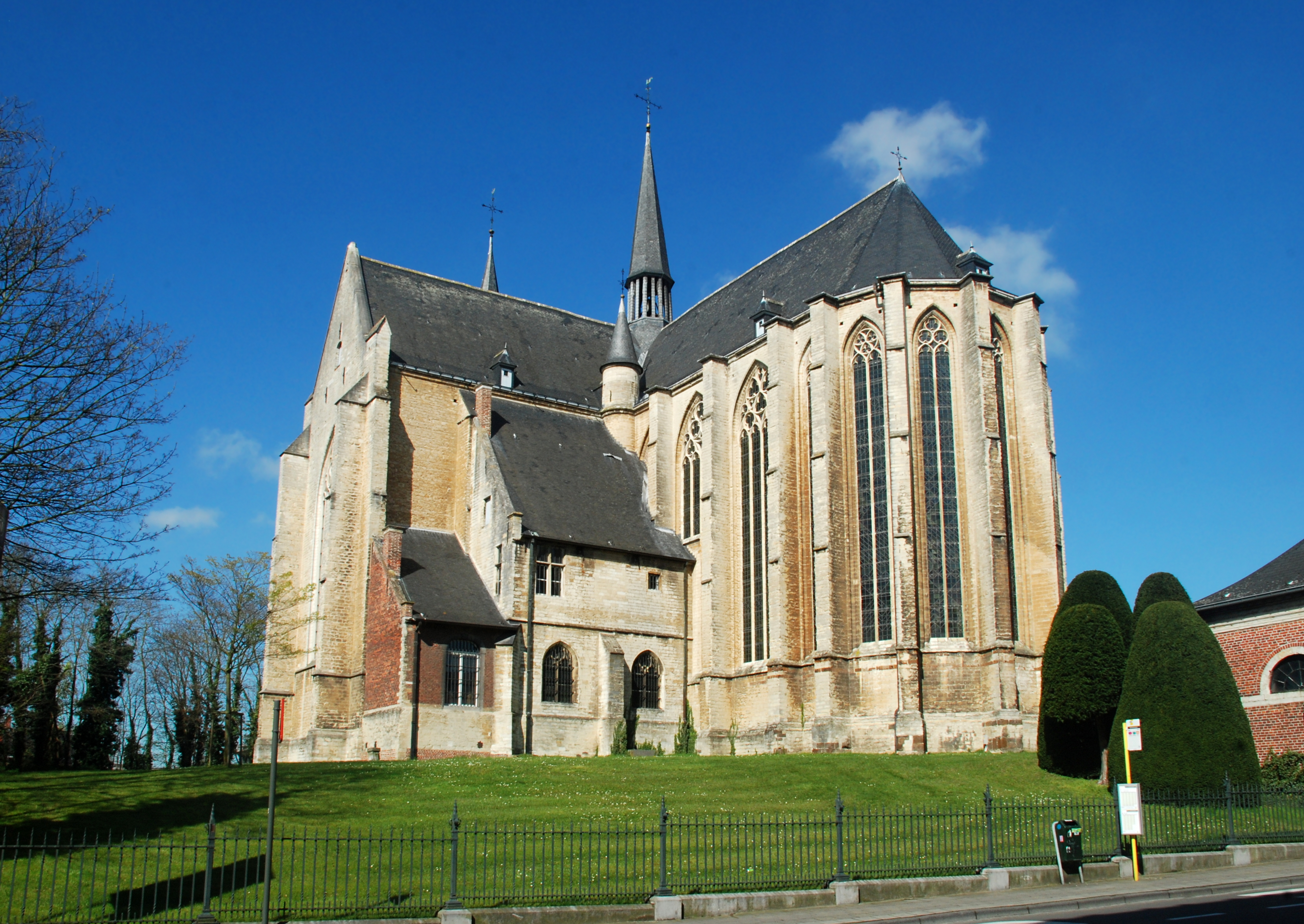
- Saint Quentin’s Church

- Location within Belgium

Religion
- Affiliation: Roman Catholic
- Diocese: Roman Catholic Archdiocese of Mechelen-Brussels

Location
- Location: Leuven, Belgium
- Interactive map of Saint Quentin's Church
- Coordinates: 50.87028°N 4.69861°E

Architecture
- Style: Gothic, Baroque, Gothic Revival architecture

Saint Quentin's Church (Dutch: Sint-Kwintenskerk) is a Roman Catholic church located at the Naamsestraat in Leuven, Belgium. Its exterior is mainly Gothic with a Baroque entrance portal. The interior contains Baroque choir stalls and altars. The church is named after the Saint Quentin, who is regarded in the Catholic faith as a protector against a wide range of contagious diseases.

== History ==
The first mention of Saint Quentin's Church (ecclesia Sancti Quintini de Hovis) dates from 1222. The patronage right rests at that time with the chapter of the St. Peter's Church in Leuven. In 1252 Saint Quentin's Church became an independent parish. In addition to being a parish church, the church was also a busy pilgrimage church where Saint Quentin was worshiped, a tradition that survived until the 20th century. The popular saint Saint Quentin was specifically invoked as protector against a number of diseases, including dropsy, whooping cough and childhood diseases. In particular during the 16th century when there were many pest epidemics, the church was an important place of pilgrimage. Every year, two great pilgrimages accompanied by a solemn procession took place.

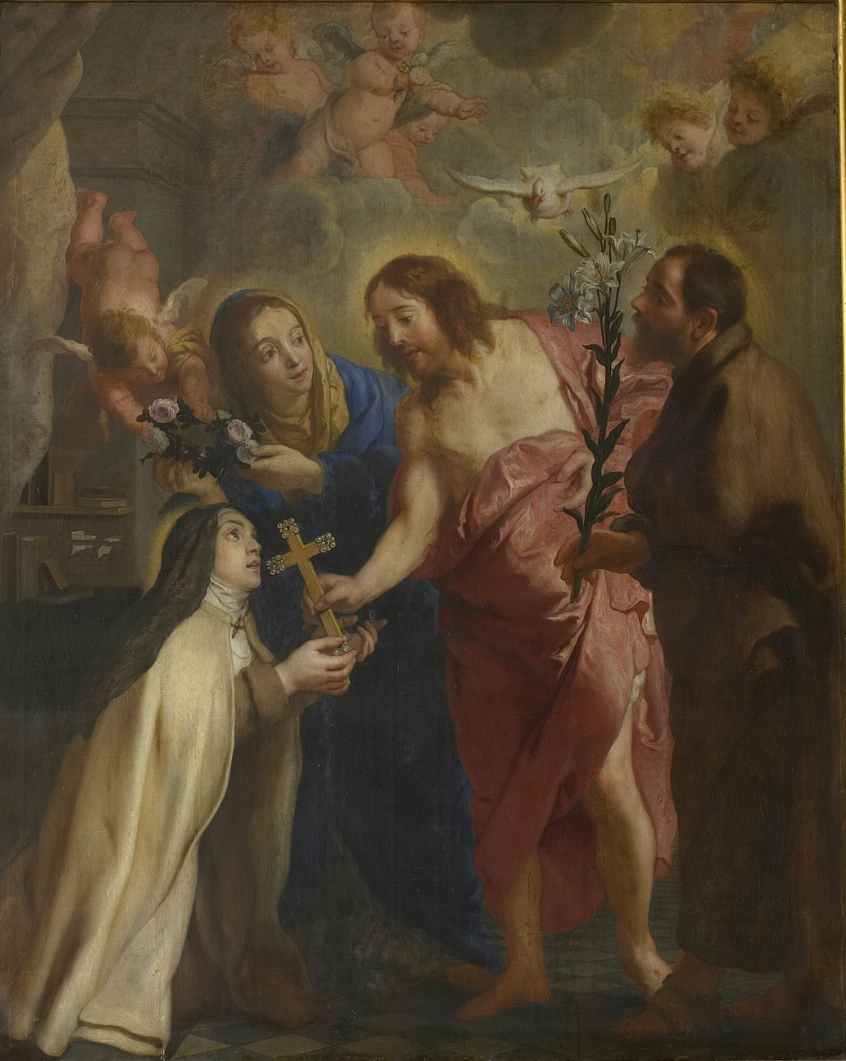
The vision of St Theresa of Avila by Gaspar de Crayer

The oldest sections of the church are the lower parts of the west tower and the adjacent aisles, built in the first half of the 13th century. A comparative study of the stonemasonry techniques shows that construction of the choir of the late Gothic church commenced at the beginning of the 15th century and not around 1450 as previously assumed. After the completion of the choir around 1430, the southern cross-arm and the traverses of the northern cross-arm and the southern aisle of the nave were completed between 1430 and 1450. The ship and transept of the church were roofed over in 1488 and the cross of the northern cross-arm and the transverse section were erected in 1489. The ship was only roofed over in 1532–1534. In 1535 the sacristy was built in the corner between the choir and the southern cross-arm.

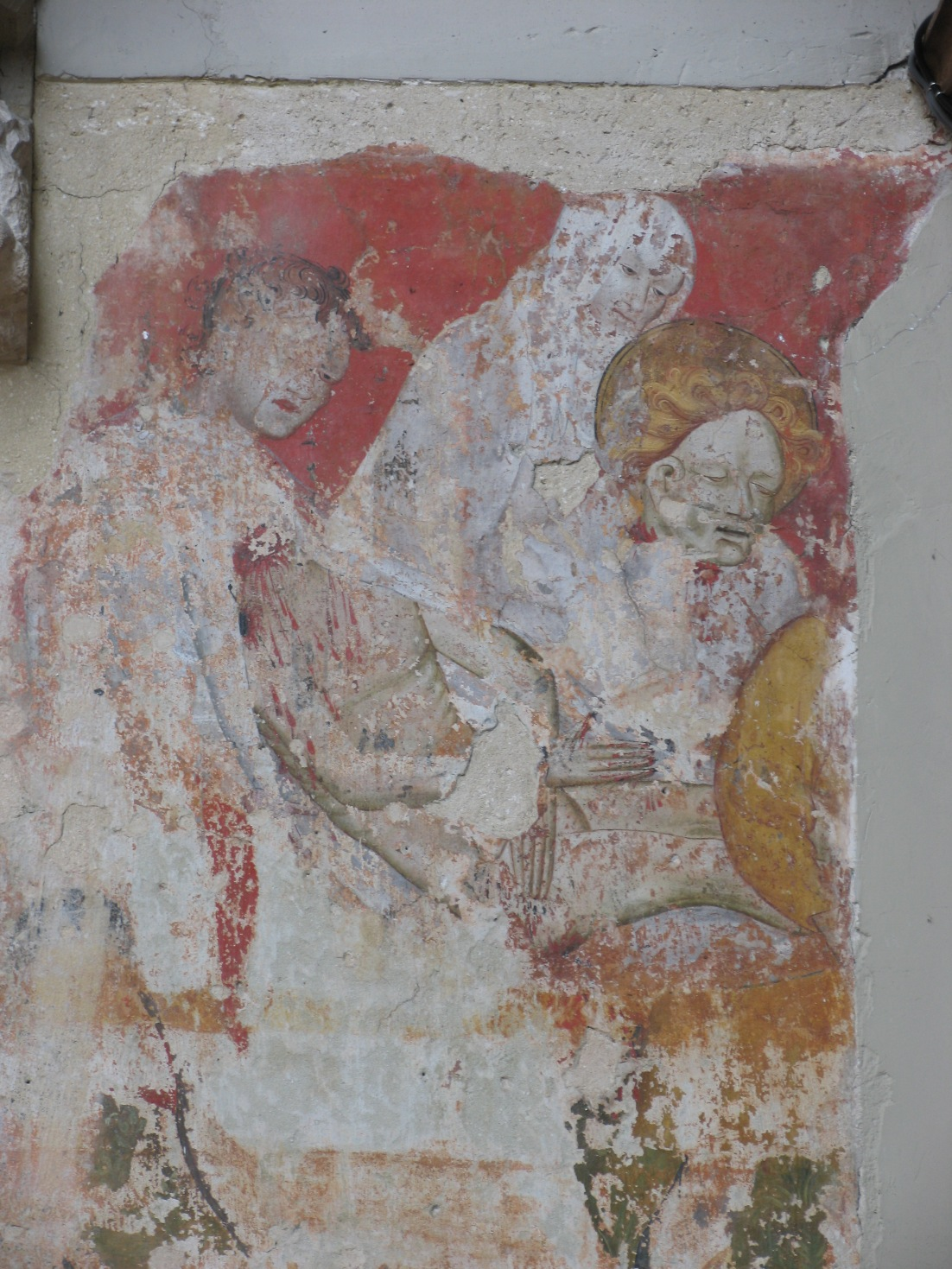
Mural depicting the retrieval from the Somme of the head and torso of St Quentin

Between 1768 and 1774, the lower side sacristy was added. The Baroque entrance portal against the northern aisle was built in 1641. The low construction against the east side of the northern arm of the cross also dates from the 17th century. The largely Baroque church furniture was supplemented after 1796 with pieces from the demolished monastery of the Discalced Carmelites in the Naamsestraat. In 1797 the Saint Quentin's Church was closed by the French occupiers. Jan-Baptist De Bruyn, the last pastor of the Ancien Régime, refused to take the oath of hatred and was deported by the French to Cayenne where he died. On 18 July 1802 the church was reopened for the Catholic cult.

Saint Quentin's Church was gradually restored between 1895 and 1914 by architect Pierre Langerock (1859-1923). In 1928 the church furniture and the most important paintings in the church were restored. Repair work on the bell-chair was carried out in 1951. After maintenance work in 1960 by architect Simon Brigode (1909-1978) a restoration was undertaken between 1967 and 1971 by architect Brigode with the collaboration of Professor Raymond M. Lemaire (1921-1997). The latest restoration works took place in 1995-1996 and concerned the windows in the transverse façades of the transept.

== The exterior ==
The exterior of Saint Quentin's Church is mainly executed in a late Gothic style. The church has a cruciform plan and consists of a west tower, a three-aisled basilic nave, a strong projecting transept and a single-sided, polygonal closed choir. The lower sections of the west tower and the flanked low side aisles are remains of the 13th-century church building. The tower floor with the echo holes and the octagonal spire are an addition by architect Pierre Langerock dating to 1898–1902. The west facades of the tower and side aisles rest on a plinth that continues along the north and south walls of the aisles. In the longitudinal facades of the side aisles, pointed arch windows have been installed.

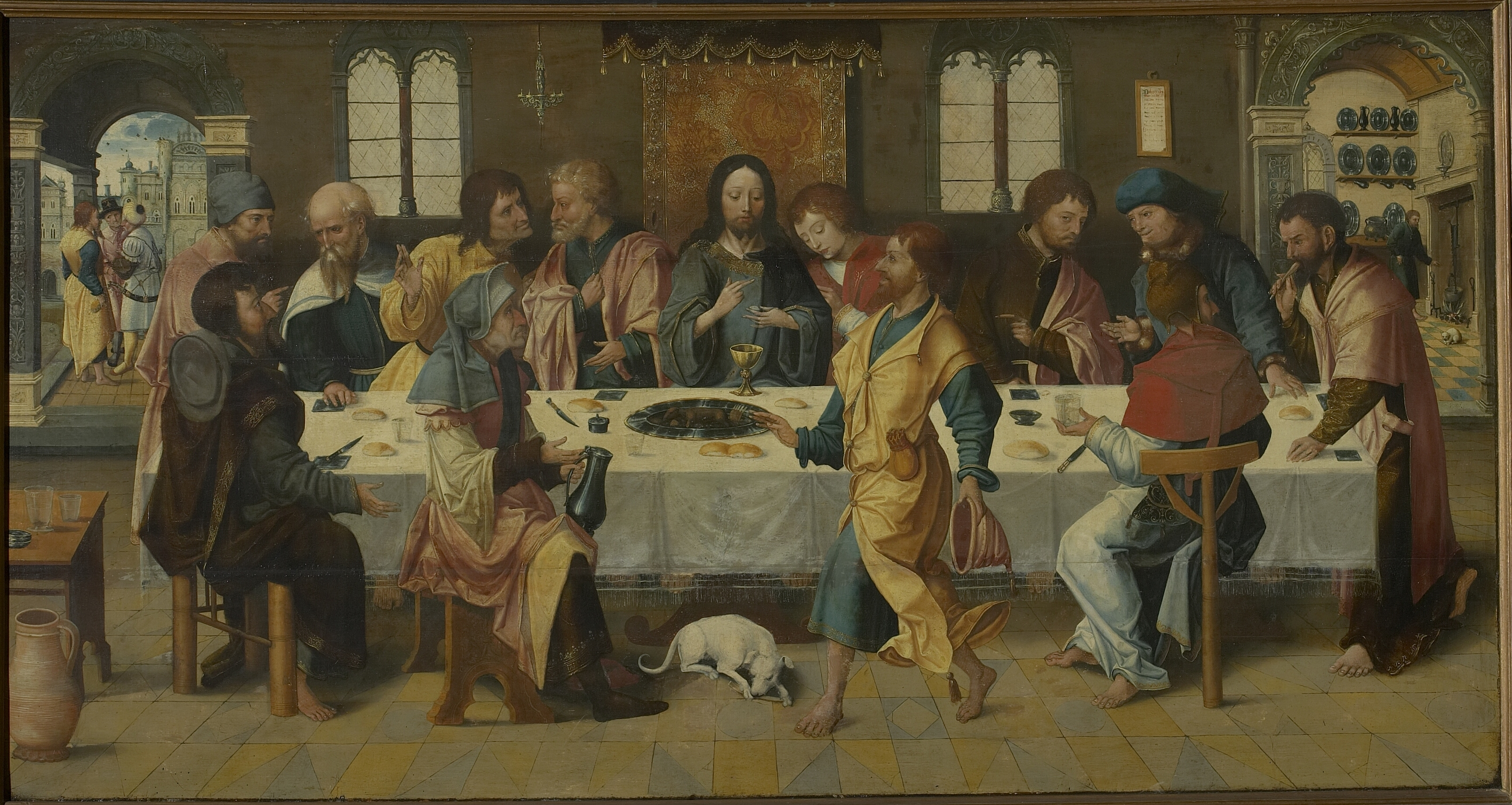
The last supper by Jan Willems

Against the west walls of the late-Gothic nave, two buttresses with traps of the original 13th-century construction have been retained. Building materials of the western part are Ledian limestone and iron sandstone, while the roof is covered with slates. In the south aisle the late-Gothic portal with surbased arch and profiled edges has been preserved. The old entrance in the north aisle was replaced by a Baroque portal. The building materials of the church are Ledian limestone, Gobertange limestone and, in the substructure of the choir, iron sandstone.

== The interior ==
In the center of the vaults, decorative wall paintings with vegetal motifs were added by Langerock during the 1905-1908 restoration. The original vault paintings in the transept were probably painted over. On the north and south walls of the choir are fragments of murals depicting the legend of Saint Quentin. Stylistically, the murals can be situated in the first quarter of the 15th century. The painting is very refined. In a surefire way, the faces and the naked body of the Holy Kwinten are modeled with shades of gray. His heavy and voluminous head extracted from the water contrasts strongly with the rather small and refined face of the other figures.

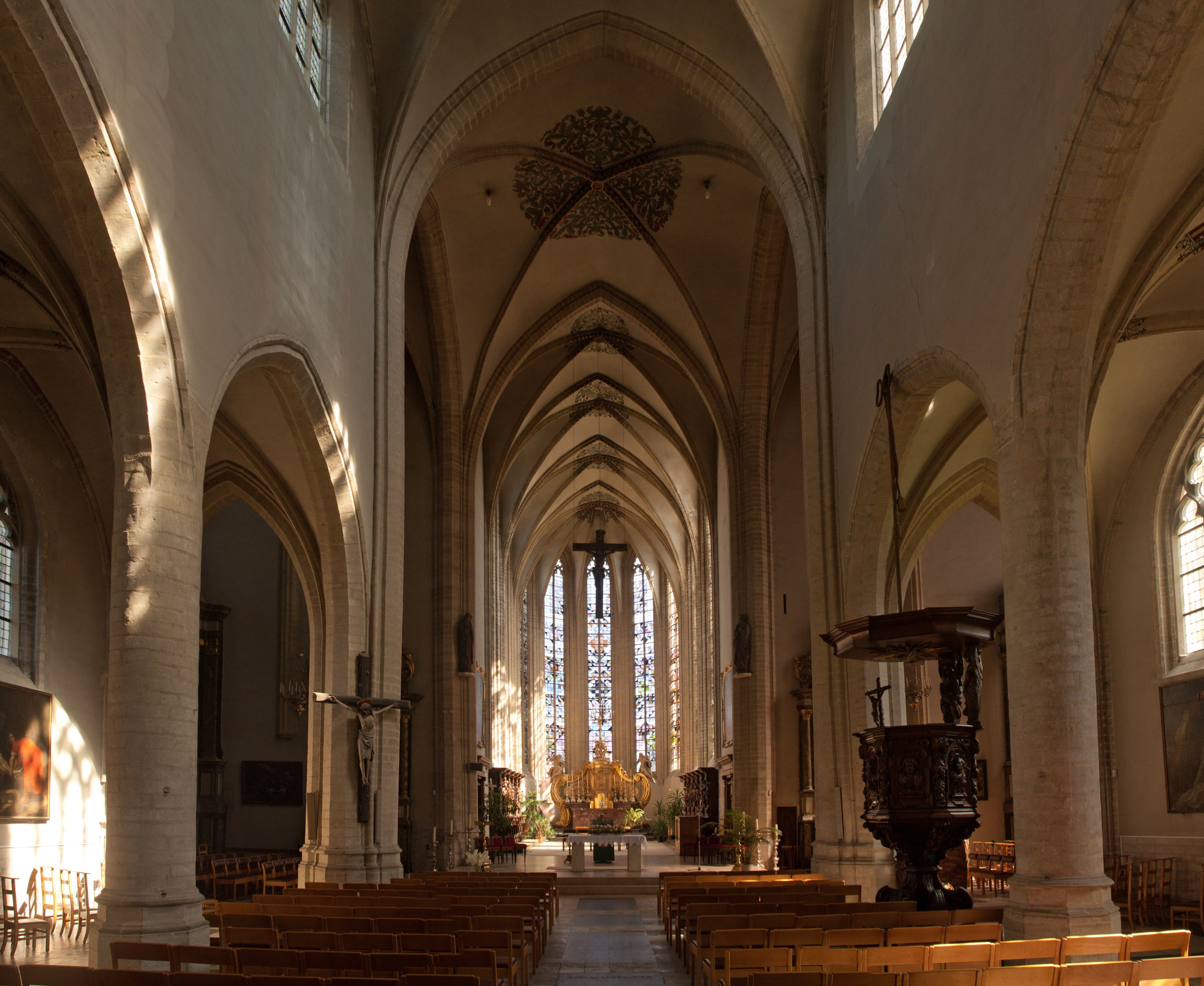
The nave

Under the eastern crossbow, the remains of a triumphal cross in polychromed wood with statues of Mary and John (circa 1500) hang against the eastern crossroads and centrally Christ on the cross (circa 1600). Against the north and south wall of the choir stand the baroque choir stalls (circa 1650–1720)t. The choir stalls are decorated with statues sculpted by the Antwerp sculptor Jan (Frans) van Ussel or van Ursel (1760-1802). They represent the apostles, the seven Christian virtues and personifications of Love, Prayer, Penance and Teaching. The current, recent altar in natural stone is located under the eastern crossing arch.

The organ that was built in 1786 by Aegidius-Franciscus Van Peteghem for the Heilig Geestcollege in Louvain was transferred to the church after its abolition during the French occupation of the Southern Netherlands commencing in 1792. The two large pointed arch windows of the cross arms contain neo-Gothic glass windows after a design by the glazier M. Mertens (Koekelberg), restored in 1995–1996. The window in the southern transept contains depictions of the saints Eugenius, Carolus, Clemens and Eduardus, in the window in the north transept Francis, Dominicus, Augustine and Benedictus are depicted. The windows of the choir contain modern glass windows by Michel Martens (1970). The ceiling of the church is still original.

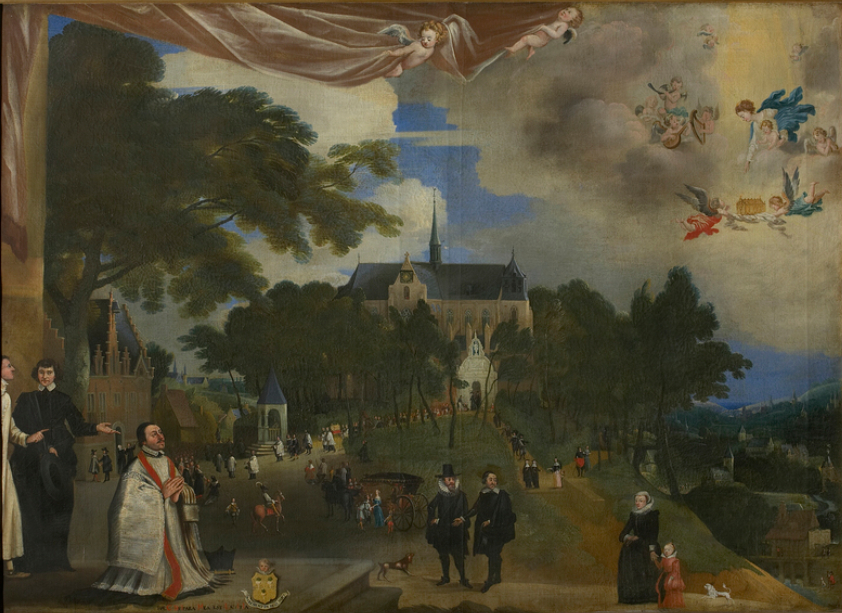
Annual pilgrimage to Our Lady of Wavre-Basse

In the southern cross-arm, also known as the Saint Quentin's choir, two Baroque altars were installed. The southern altar holds the painting The torture of Saint Quentin by Pieter-Jozef Verhaghen (1758, after original by Gaspar de Crayer). The northern altar holds The vision of Theresia of Avila attributed to Gaspar de Crayer, which was transferred from the monastery of the Discalced Carmelites. A late eighteenth-century confessional seat is erected against the south wall. The southern altar contains a 17th-century tabernacle in ebony and turtle leather, also from the monastery of the Discalced Carmelites, in the Northern Cross-arm or Our Lady's Choir. The central painting with Saint Anna surrounded by plague saints is by Gaspar de Crayer (1618). The other altar in the northern transept contains an image of Mary with child on the globe (17th century). Against the northern wall of the northern cross-arm is a seventeenth-century confessional. The church also has a Last supper dated 1521 by the Leuven city painter Jan Willems, which is executed in a Renaissance style. Other paintings in the church include The entombment of Christ by Jan van den Hoecke, a Christ healing the lame at the pool of Bethesda by Artus Wolffort and several more works by Pieter-Jozef Verhaghen, Jan Jozef Verhaghen and anonymous painters. The church also houses a sculpture of Saint Quentin by Artus Quellinus the Elder and another of a Virgin and Child attributed to the same artist.
