= Jan Rombouts the Elder =

16th-century Flemish Renaissance painter

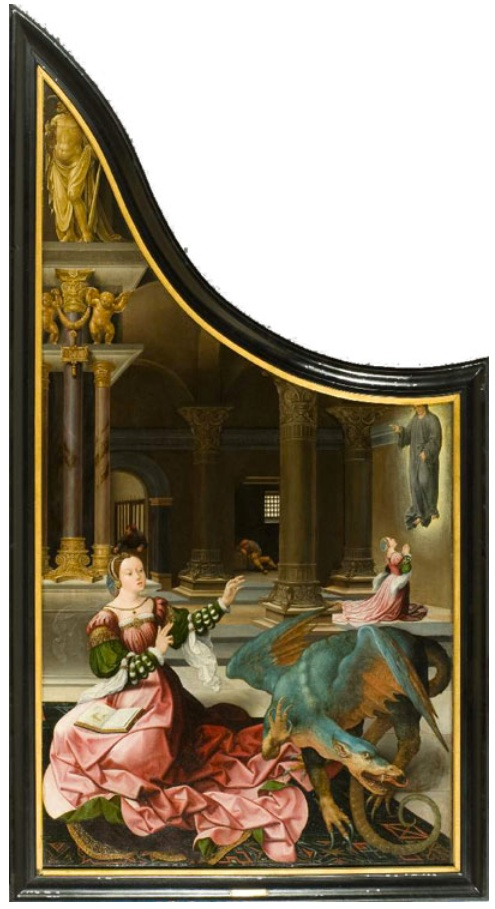
St. Margaret of Antioch

Jan Rombouts the Elder, Jan Rombouts (I) (c. 1480 in Leuven – 1535 in Leuven), was a Flemish Renaissance painter, glass painter, draftsman, printmaker and glass designer. The subjects of his work are stories from the Old and New Testament and the lives of Christian saints. He was active in Leuven where he introduced the Renaissance innovations of Bernard van Orley and the Antwerp school.

== Life ==
The details of the life of Jan Rombouts are sketchy. He signed his work with a monogram which had been read by the 19th century city archivist of Leuven Edward van Even as representing the letters IVR. As a result, he identified the painter using this monogram with the Leuven city painter Jan van Rillaer. When it was discovered that Jan van Rillaer was only born around 1520-1525 it became clear that he could not be identified with the monogrammist since the latter had already produced work in the period 1520–1525. It was subsequently understood that Edward van Even had misread the monogram, which should actually be read as IANR. Archival records also showed that van Rillaer was in fact never documented as a painter. Based on this and other evidence it became possible to identify the monogrammist IANR with Jan Rombouts the Elder who was referred to in contemporary records as a painter.

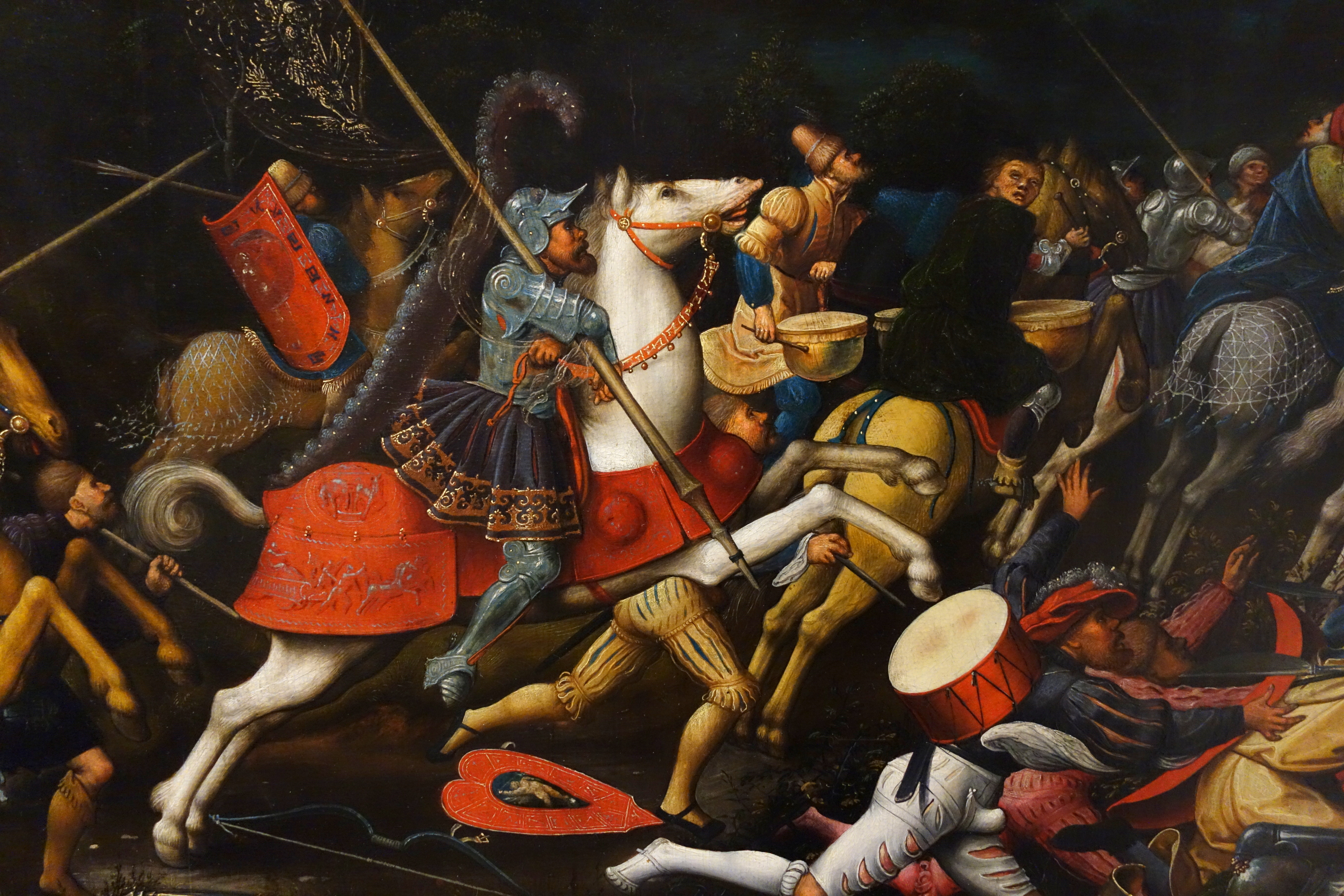
The Conversion of St. Paul (detail)

The earliest known archival document about Jan Rombouts dates from 1508 and refers to him as 'Johannes Rombouts pictor'. Jan Rombouts the Elder was the grand nephew of the glass painter Claes Rombouts. He was mainly active in his hometown Leuven. He worked on commissions for religious institutions such as the two altarpieces for the St. Peter's Church in Leuven as well as for private patrons.

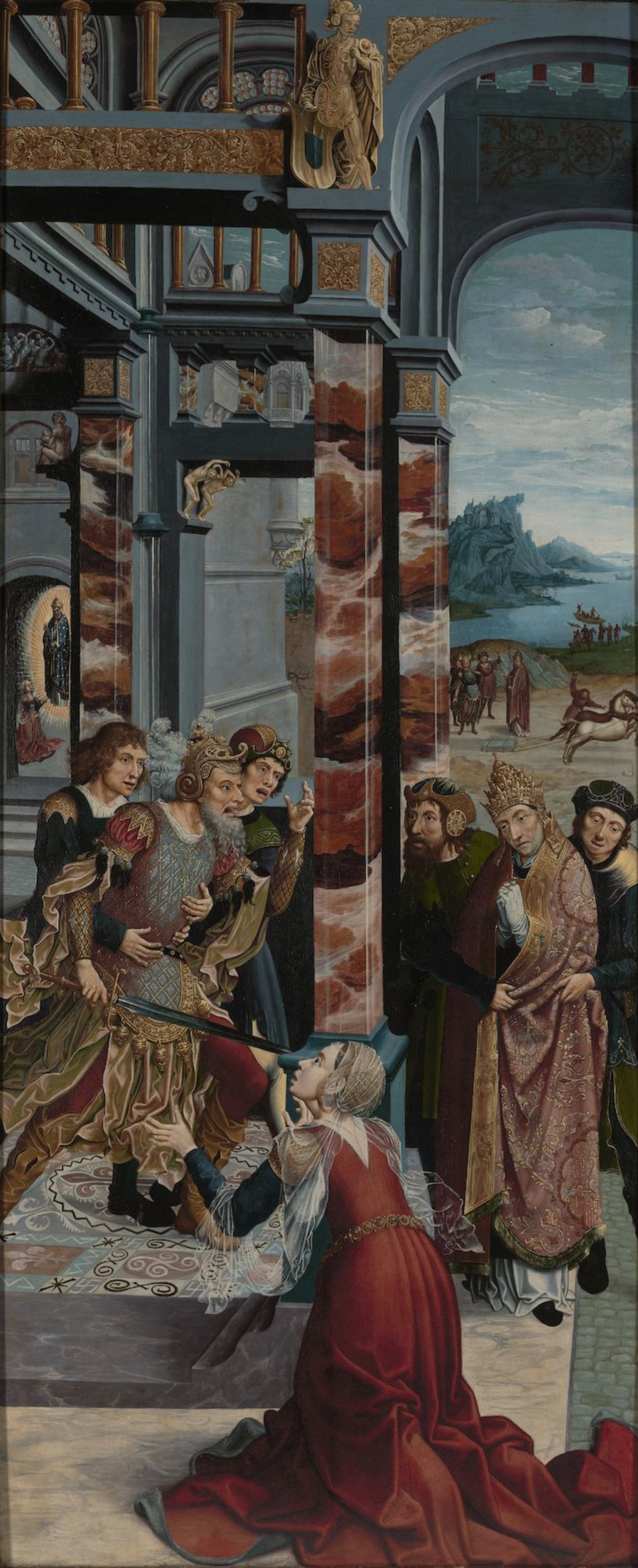
Arrest and martyrdom of Pope Clement of Rome

Rombouts married Barbele Roelants, with whom he had two children. His son Jan Rombouts the Younger also became a painter. His daughter Marie married Jan Willems, a prominent painter in Leuven. Jan Rombouts was dean of Leuven's city administration from 1519 until his death in 1535. Along with Albrecht Bouts, the son of the famous painter Dieric Bouts, he served on the board of governors of the Klerkenkapel (the Clerical chapel, now the Antonine chapel on the Pater Damiaanplein in Leuven).

His son (ca. 1505–59) worked in his father's workshop and also held public offices in Leuven, such as that of alderman. Only the son is documented as a glass painter but the evidence seems to indicate that Jan Rombouts I was also a glass painter.

== Work ==
Jan Rombouts is regarded as an important modernizer through his complex compositions, moving figures, lively and colourful palette, meticulous eye for detail and pseudo-Renaissance architectural elements. He thus introduced the innovations of Bernard van Orley and the Antwerp school in Leuven. Bernard van Orley is known for introducing into Flemish painting Italianizing elements derived from Italian Renaissance painting, and in particular Raphael. At the same time Rombouts did not stray too far from the traditions of Early Netherlandisch painting as exemplified in the work of his famous fellow townsman Dieric Bouts.

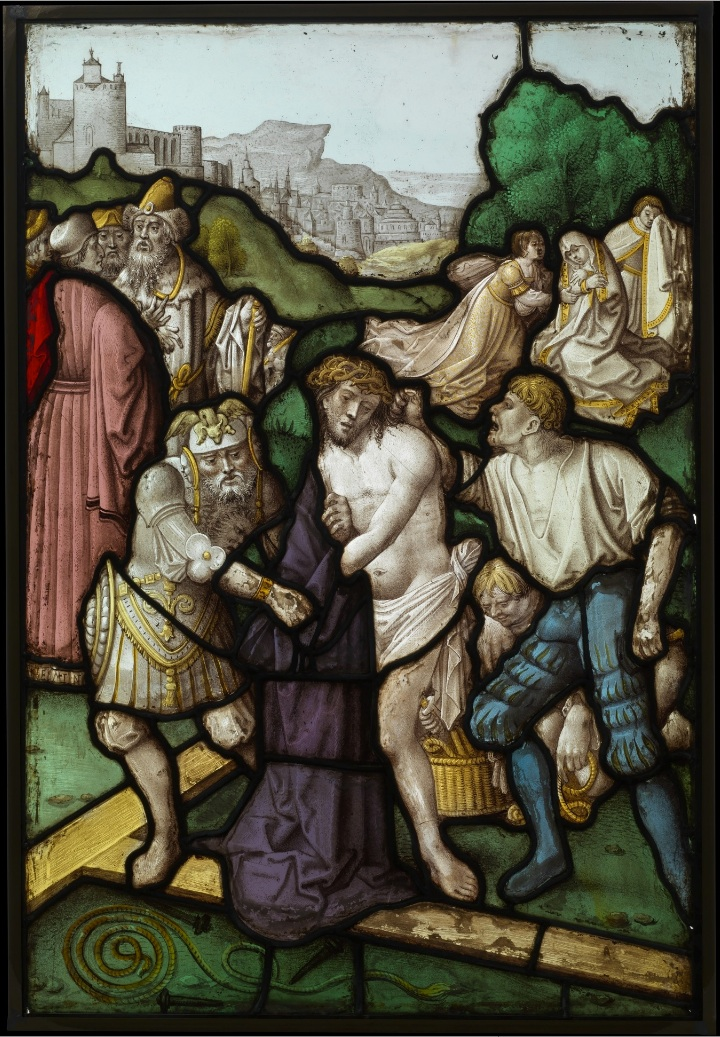
Preparation for the Crucifixion, stained glass

His oeuvre is now believed to comprise a handful of paintings (comprising five double-sided altarpiece wings and a single panel), seven engravings, a drawing on wood panel of The Judgment of Solomon, a vidimus drawing for a four-light church window (Amsterdam, Rijksmuseum) and more than two dozen painted glass windows, some of them believed to be after Rombouts’ design rather than by the master himself.

His earliest known painting is The birth of St. John the Baptist (circa 1515–1520, collection of the Carnegie Museum of Art in Pittsburgh). This early work shows the painter still struggling with his figures. The neatly painted Renaissance architectural details indicate the artist's interest in contemporary artistic developments in Italy. The result is a work rooted in the 15th century Flemish tradition of Early Netherlandish painting but with a focus on Italy and the mannerism of among others Bernard van Orley. His principal panel works are the monogrammed wings of a dismembered altarpiece depicting scenes from the New Testament stories of the Conversion of Saint Paul and The Fall of Simon the Magus (M – Museum Leuven) which are monumental and in a classicizing style. Two wings of an altarpiece with Scenes from the Life and Martyrdom of Saints Catherine and Clement are in the St. Peter's Church in Leuven. It is not known whether the panels were originally attached to a central painted panel or to a sculpted retable.

His engravings reflect the influence of his contemporaries Albrecht Dürer and Lucas van Leyden. His early prints lack technical and aesthetical finesse. His later works such as the Virgin and Child and Pyramus and Thisbe show he had mastered the art of the print medium.

A monogrammed drawing The Judgment of Solomon dated 1528 (Gemäldegalerie, Staatliche Museen, Berlin) is a design for a glass-panel. The stained glasses from the former Carthusian monastery in Leuven (parts of which are now in New York's Metropolitan Museum and the Riverside Church) have been attributed to Rombouts and his workshop.
