= Capital Virgins =

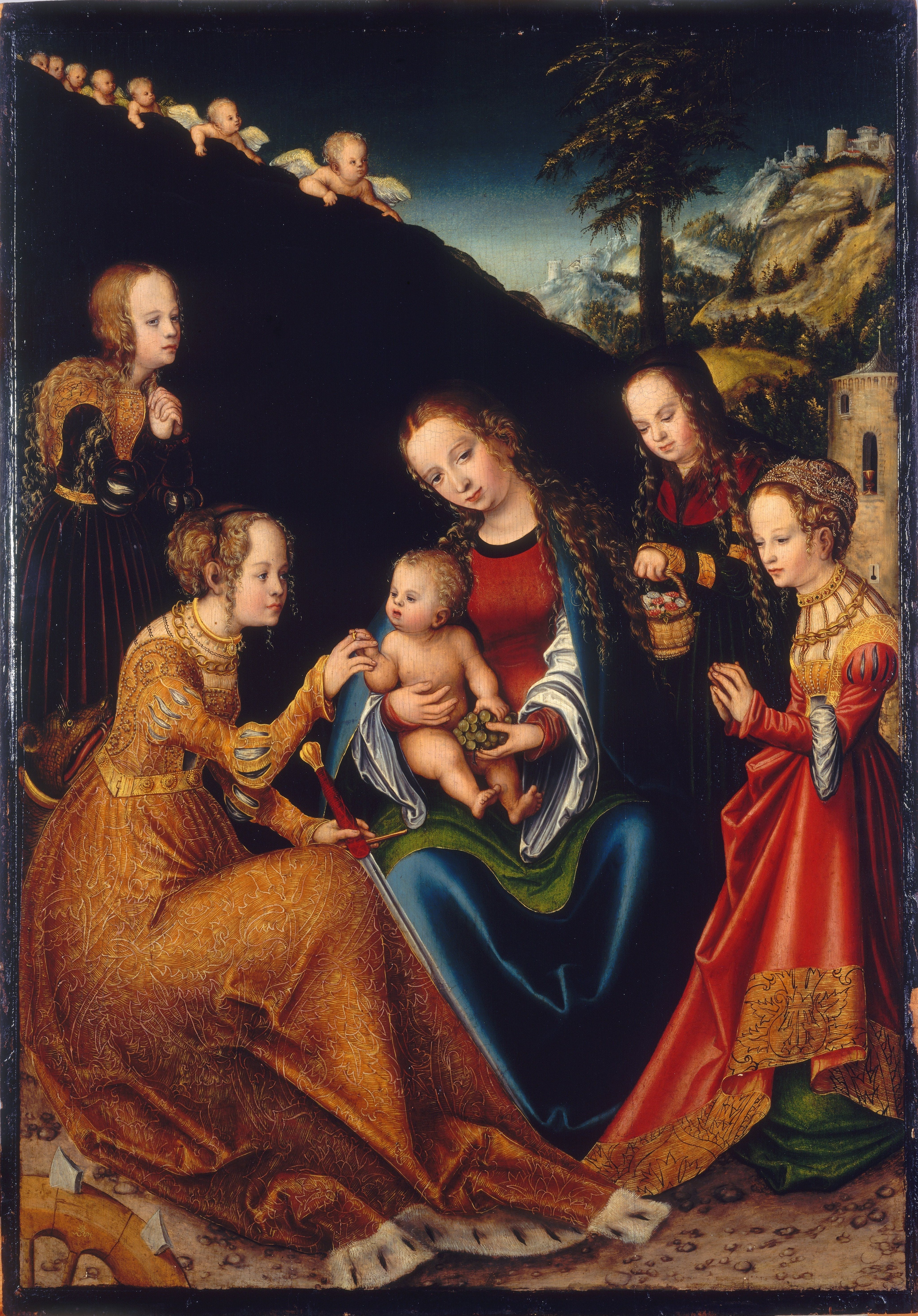
Lucas Cranach the Elder: The mystic marriage of St. Catherine with Saint Barbara, Saint Margaret and Saint Dorothea

The four capital virgins (Latin: (quattuor) virgines capitales) are a group of virgin martyrs of the early church. In literature they are also called main virgins or excellent virgins. These are: Saint Catherine of Alexandria, Saint Margaret of Antioch, Saint Barbara and Saint Dorothea. Three of them – i. e. Saint Catherine, Saint Margaret and Saint Barbara – belong to the Fourteen Holy Helpers.

In iconography these four capital virgins are often depicted together or around the Virgin Mary. Occasionally, instead of the classical formation, St. Ursula is pictured instead of Saint Dorothea. Alternatively, Saint Dorothea is depicted with the attribute of Saint Ursula, an arrow, in her hands. Paintings of the four main virgins usually represent a form of the type Virgo inter Virgines, where several virgin martyrs beside the Virgin are sitting, on a bench or bank or on the ground, usually in a garden setting within an enclosure of some sort, a hortus conclusus.

The great veneration of the four capital virgins testifies that the Missale Coloniense (Missal of Cologne), printed in 1494, contained the votive mass Missa de sanctis quatuor virginibus capitalibus.
