= Jan Willems (painter) =

Flemish painter

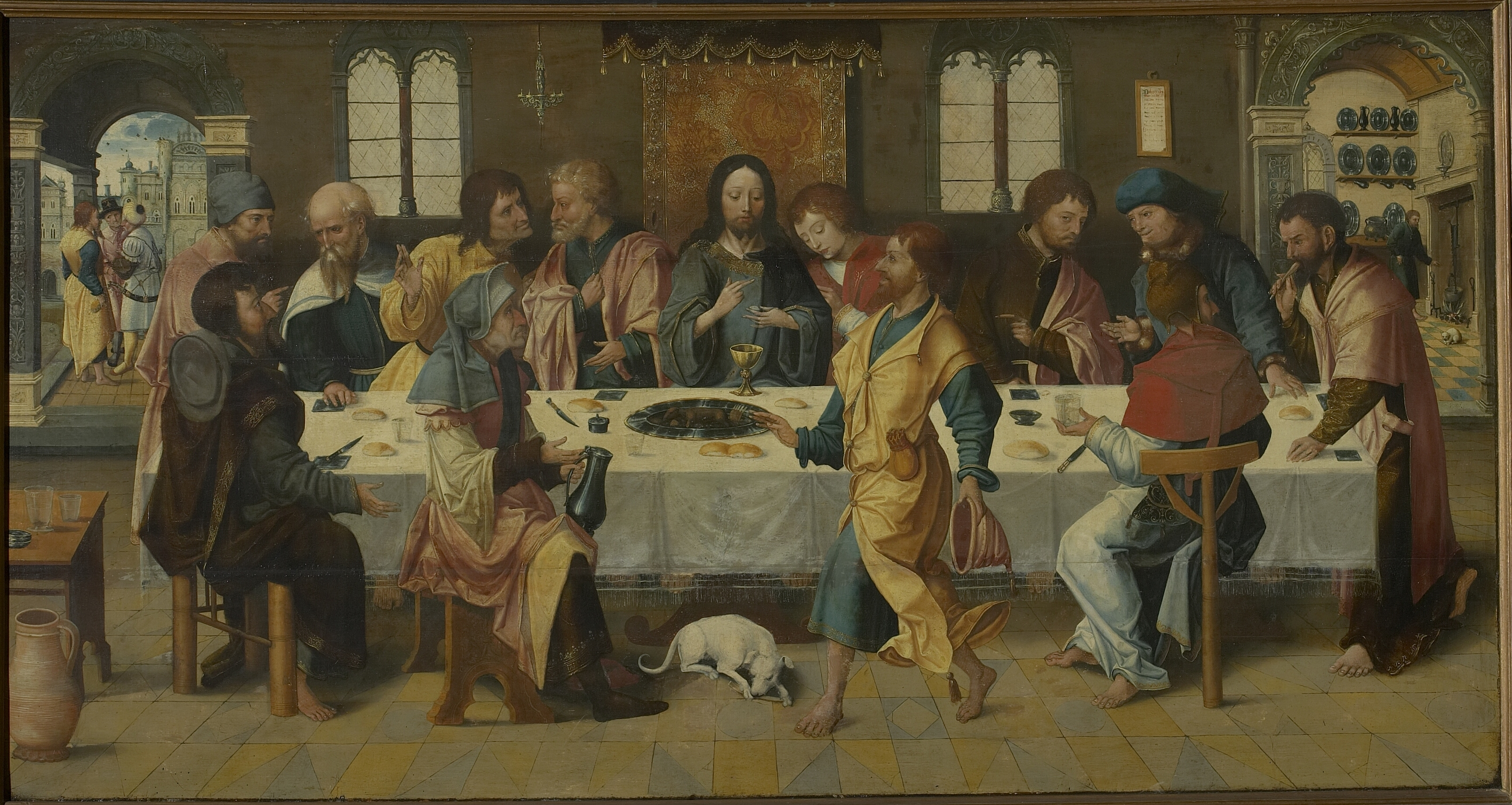
The last supper

Jan Willems (fl 1520 – 1547/1548) was a Flemish painter of religious works as well as a polychromer and a designer of large figures used in processions. He was the city painter of Leuven where he spent his entire known career.

== Life ==
Not much is known about the life of Jan Willems. He was the son of the painter Jan Willems the Elder. His father was likely his teacher. His brother Peter was also a painter. In 15th-16th century Leuven there were a few of these artists' families such as the families Bouts, Willems and Rombouts. The craft was often passed on from father to son: sons learned the trade in the workshop of the father, stayed on as a servant or master-servant and took over the workshop after the death of their father.

Artist families often intermarried in that era. Jan Willems himself married Marie Rombouts, the daughter of the city painter Jan Rombouts the Elder, who himself was related to the famous glass painter Nicolaas Rombouts. Willems was certainly already active in 1520, as the earliest document stating his name was dated to that year. The document relates to a payment made to the artist for the polychroming of a stone statue. With his brother-in-law Jan Rombouts the Younger, Jan Willems collaborated on at least one, now lost, ensemble, the Saint Severinus altarpiece, which had been commissioned by the Weavers' Guild for the St. Peter's Church in Leuven. Willems was appointed the city painter of Leuven, a post he held from 1527 to 1548. In that capacity he received a number of commissions from the city, especially in relation to the decorations for the annual Ommegang, as well as for other decorative projects of a temporary nature.

He also received a number of commissions from the local chambers of rhetoric. The artist was paid by the city for his assistance in the organisation of a passion play by the chamber of rhetoric of De Rozelieren. The nature of his assistance is not specified but likely involved the provision of decorations for the play. The chamber of rhetoric De Kersouwe paid him in 1547 for the polychroming of the statue of Saint Margaret.

With the help of assistants, Willems created the figure of the giant Megera for its first appearance in the Ommegang of Leuven of 1532. He received the commission to restore the painting of the Last Judgment by Dieric Bouts in the Leuven town hall. Other works by his hand have not been preserved. In addition to his work as a city painter, Willems carried out various assignments for the clergy. For the Saint Quentin's Church in Leuven, Jan Willems painted the predella and the side panels of a sculpted retable of Saint Quentin, that had been commissioned in 1538 from the Leuven sculptor Joris Asselijns. Willems was also tasked with the polychroming of the sculpture.

He was paid in 1534 for a number of painted panels for the Park Abbey in Heverlee. Willems painted the blazons for the funeral of Ambrosius van Engelen, abbot of the Park Abbey, who died in 1543.

Jan Willems died between 3 December 1547 and 14 August 1548.

== Work ==
The only known extant work by Jan Willems is the Last supper dated 1524–25. This large panel painting of 94 cm high by 180 cm wide is now kept in the Saint Quentin's Church in Leuven. The painting was donated to the church around 1557 as a legacy by Adriaan van Blehem, one of the most important benefactors of Saint Quentin's Church. The work reflects the growing influence of Renaissance ideas on painters in Leuven. His style is in line with that of Antwerp mannerists such as the Master of 1518 and Pieter Coecke van Aelst.
