= Dorothea of Caesarea =

Christian saint

Saint Dorothy of Caesarea
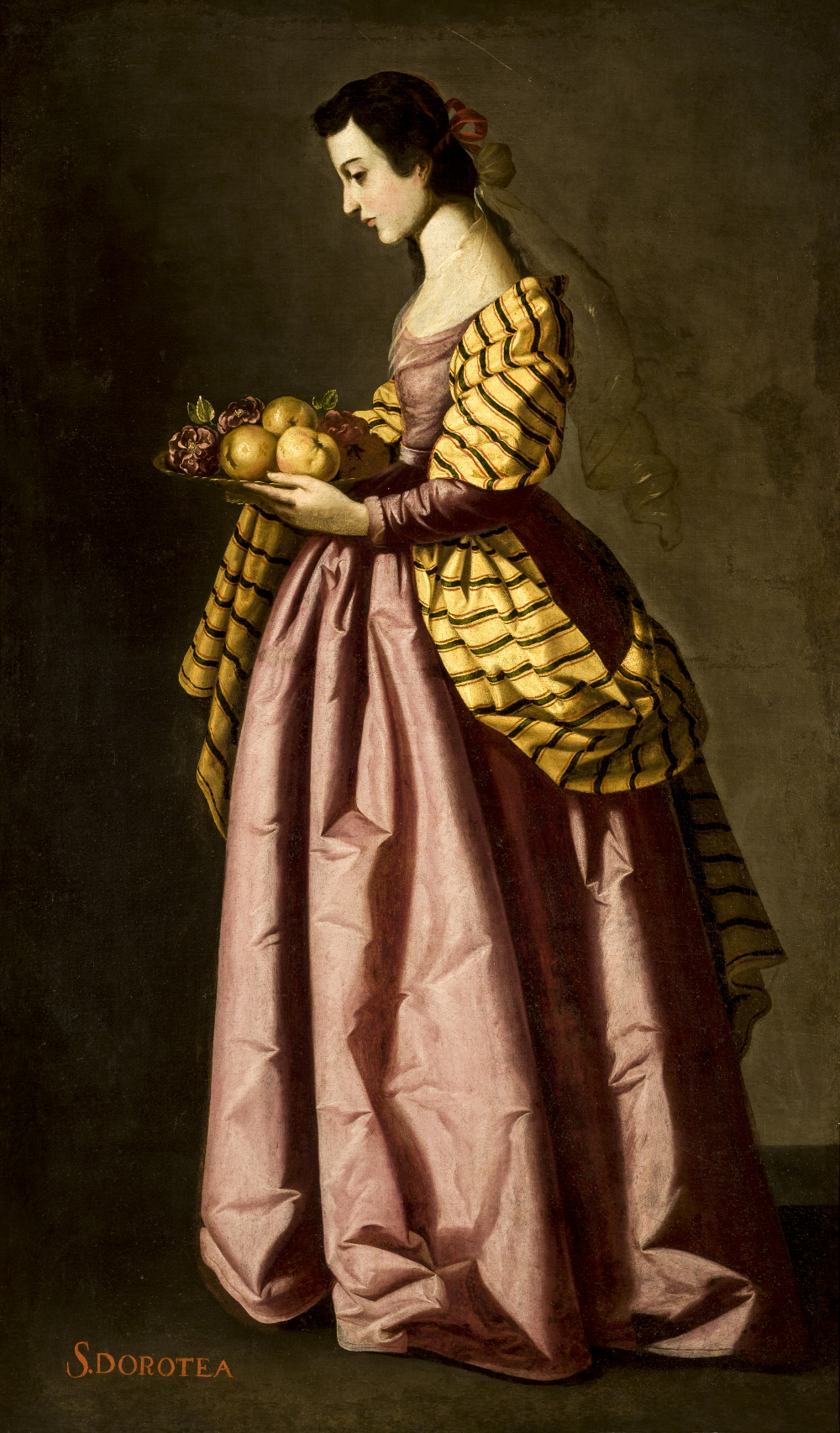
- Saint Dorothy, Francisco de Zurbarán

Virgin martyr
- Born: c. 279–290
- Died: c. 311; Caesarea Mazaca (modern-day Kayseri, Turkey)
- Venerated in: Catholic Church; Eastern Orthodox Church; Anglican Church; Lutheranism
- Feast: February 6
- Attributes: wreath or basket of roses, fruit
- Patronage: horticulture; brewers; brides; florists; gardeners; midwives; newlyweds; love; Markowa; Pescia

Dorothea of Caesarea (also known as Saint Dorothy, Greek: Δωροθέα; died c. 311 AD) is a 4th-century virgin martyr who was executed at Caesarea Mazaca. Evidence for her actual historical existence or acta is very sparse. She is called a martyr of the late Diocletianic Persecution, although her death occurred after the resignation of Diocletian himself.

Dorothea and her companion, Theophilus, are mentioned in the Roman Martyrology as martyrs of Caesarea in Cappadocia, with a feast on 6 February. She is officially recognized as a virgin martyr. However, with the promulgation of the motu proprio Mysterii Paschalis of Pope Paul VI, Dorothea was removed from the General Roman Calendar, being judged as not having "universal significance". Her feast is still retained in some regional calendars and the Tridentine Calendar.

== Life ==
The earliest record that mentions Dorothea is found in the Martyrologium Hieronymianum. This first record contains only three basic facts: the day of martyrdom, the place where it occurred, and her name and that of Theophilus.

== Legend ==
Virgin and martyr, Dorothea of Caesarea was persecuted during the persecution of Diocletian, on 6 February, 311, at Caesarea in Cappadocia. She was brought before the prefect Sapricius, tried, tortured, and sentenced to death. On her way to the place of execution the pagan lawyer Theophilus said to her in mockery: "Bride of Christ, send me some fruits from your bridegroom's garden." Before she was executed, she sent him, by a six-year-old boy, her headdress which was found to be filled with a heavenly fragrance of roses and fruits. Theophilus at once confessed himself a Christian, was put on the rack, and suffered death. This is the oldest version of the legend, which was later variously enlarged.

== Veneration ==
In the Western church Dorothy of Caesarea has been venerated since the seventh century. Since the fourteenth century many artists created paintings and sculptures, which are to be found throughout Europe. In late medieval Sweden Saint Dorothy was considered to be the 15th of the Holy Helpers, and in arts she occurred with Saints Barbara, Catherine and Margaret, forming with them a quartet of female virgin martyrs called Quattuor Virgines Capitales, meaning "The four Capital Virgins".

Dorothy of Caesarea is regarded as the patroness of gardeners, due to her virginal attribute of a wreath of roses.

On her feast on 6 February trees are blessed. Saint Dorothy is also patroness of brewers, brides, florists, midwives, newlyweds and of the village of Pescia in Italy.

The Sisters of St. Dorothy is a congregation of sisters, occupied primarily with teaching.

Dorothy of Caesarea's life and martyrdom was the basis of Philip Massinger and Thomas Dekker's The Virgin Martyr (printed 1622).

=== Iconography ===
Saint Dorothy is often depicted as a virgin carrying a basket of flowers, sometimes with fruit, and also wearing a crown of roses; she has also been depicted as being: surrounded by stars as she kneels before the executioner; crowned with palm, referring to the martyr's palm; in an enclosed garden or an orchard with the Christ Child in an apple tree; leading the Christ Child by the hand; veiled with flowers in her lap; and holding apples from heaven on a branch.

== Depictions ==
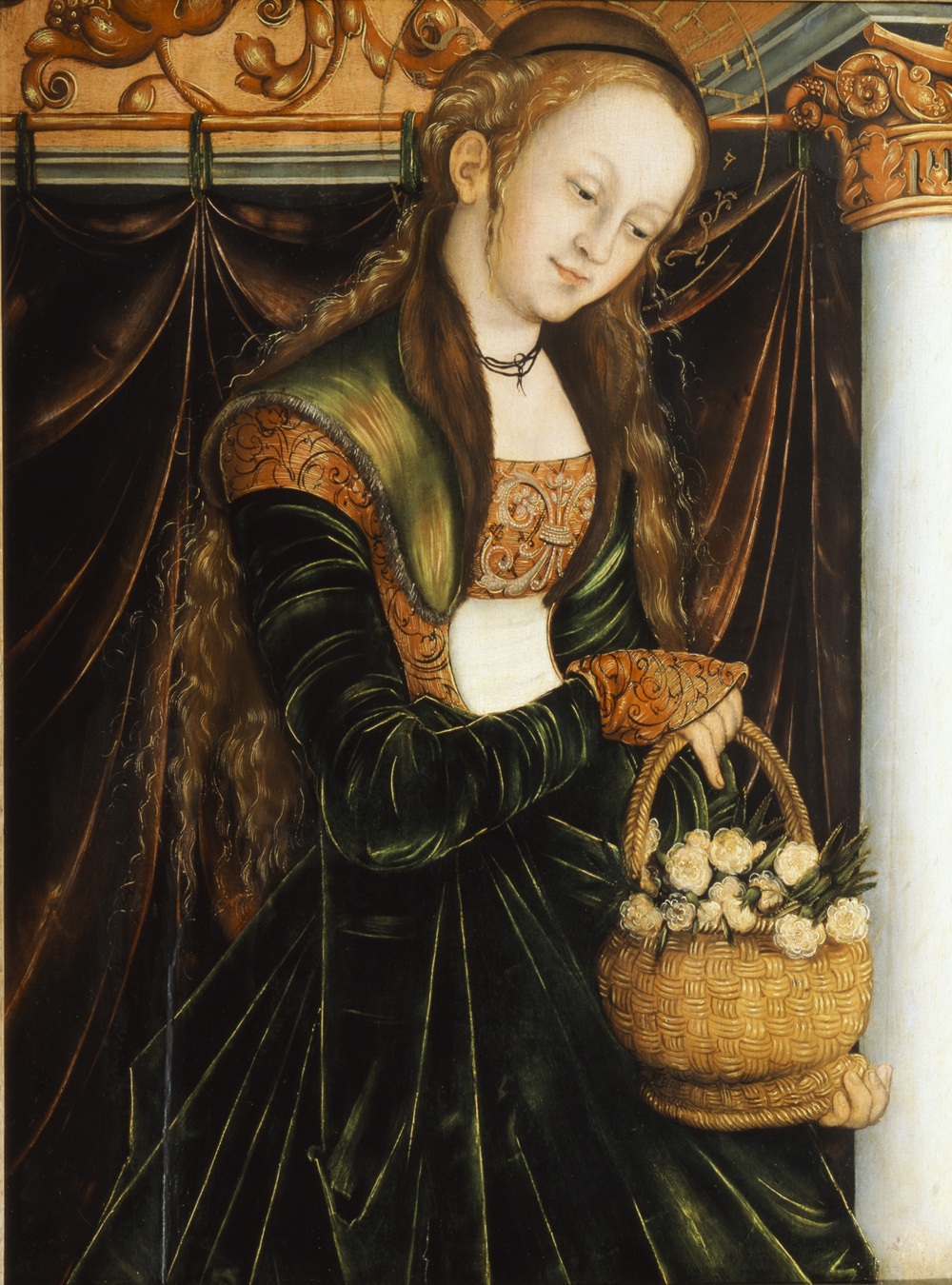
Die Heilige Dorothea, by Lucas Cranach the Elder.

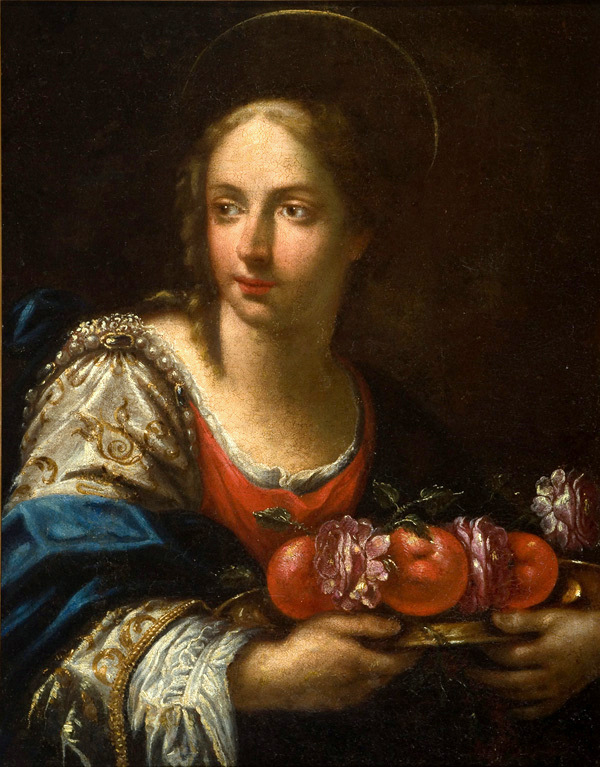
Saint Dorothy by Girolamo Donnini

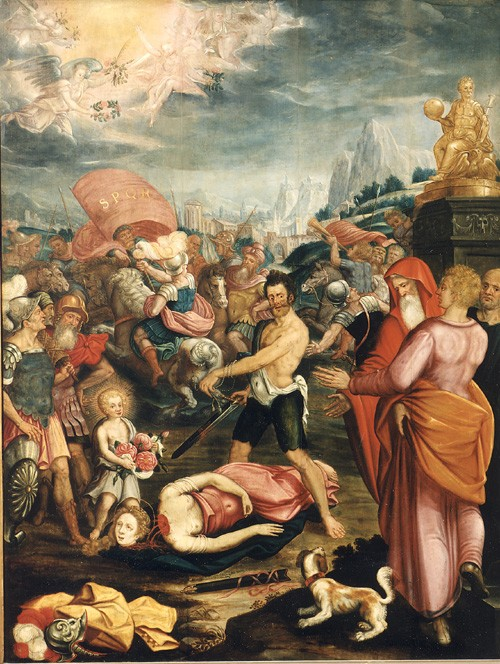
The Martyrdom of Saint Dorothea by Josse van der Baren

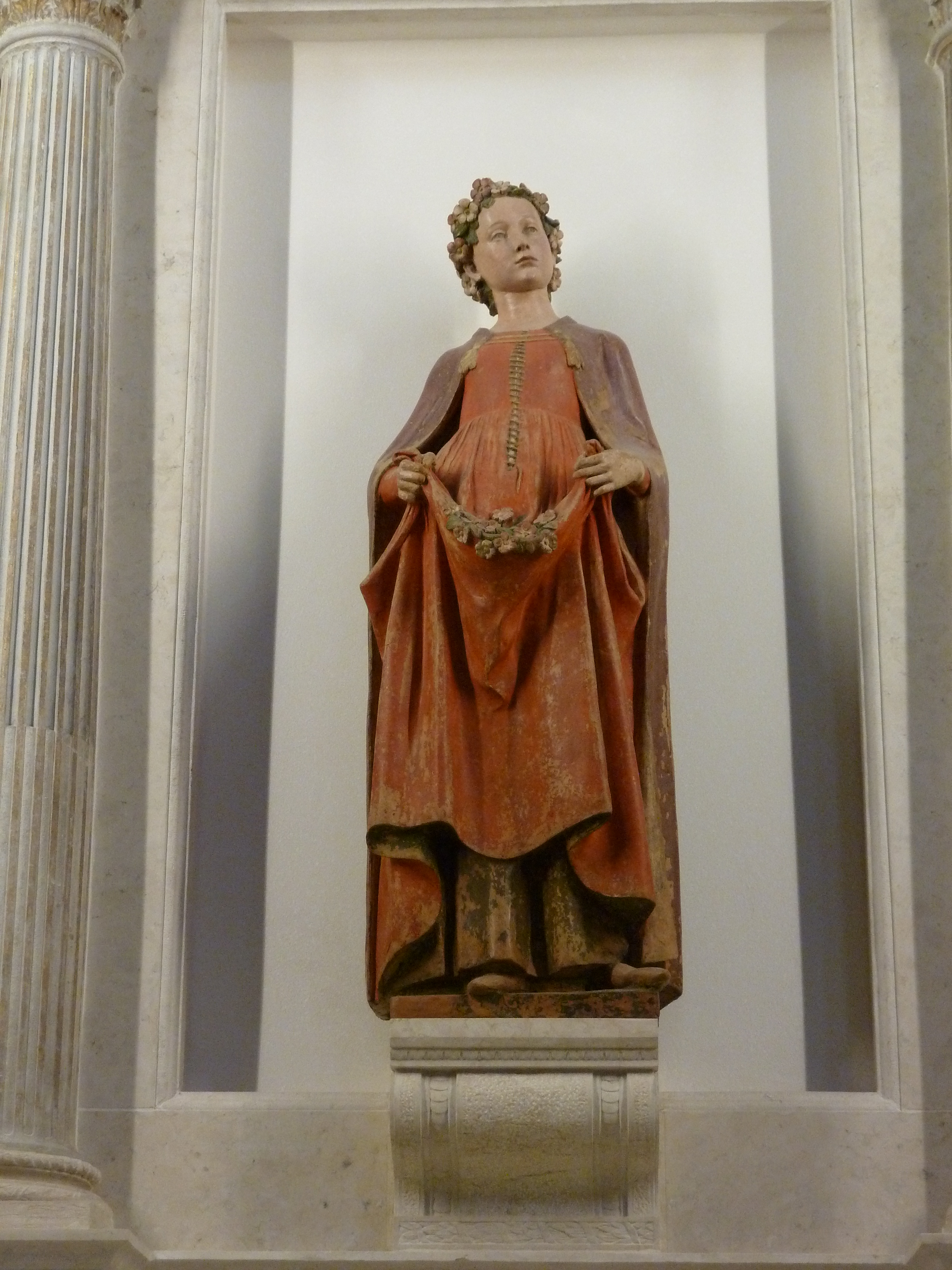
Santa Dorotea, statue by Luca della Robbia

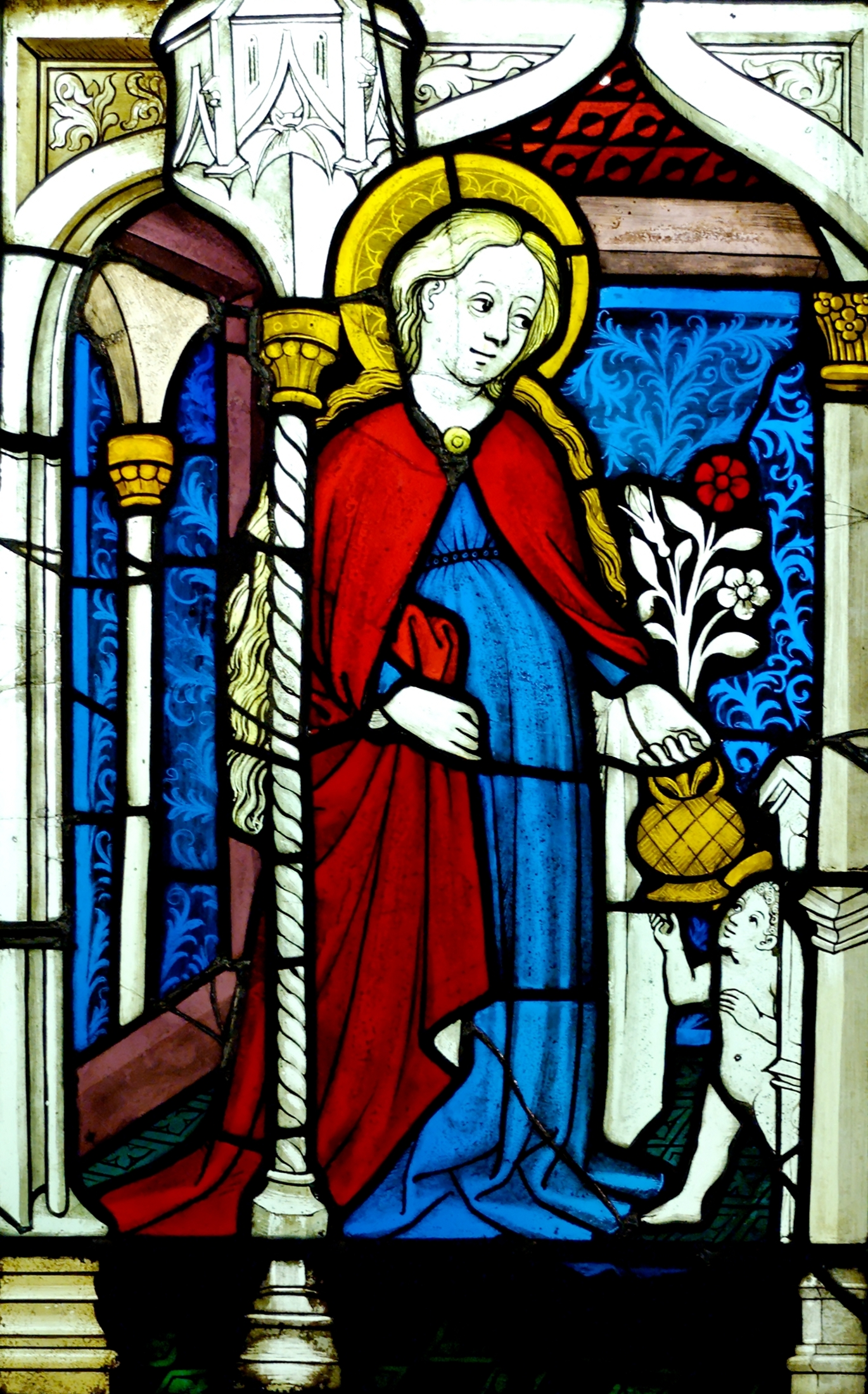
Stained glass representing St. Dorothea of Caesarea. Upper Rhine, ca. 1450

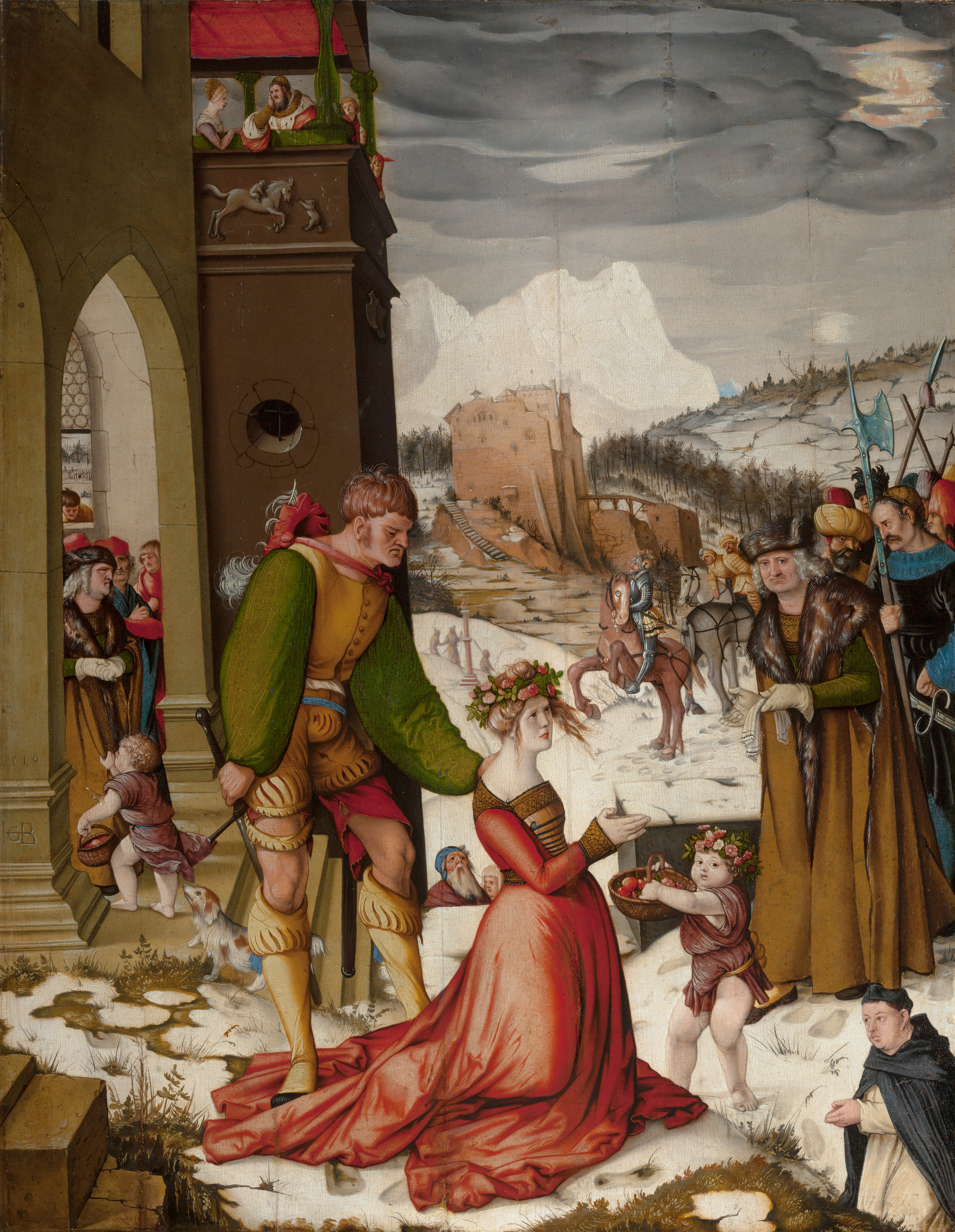
The Decapitation of Saint Dorothy, Hans Baldung Grien

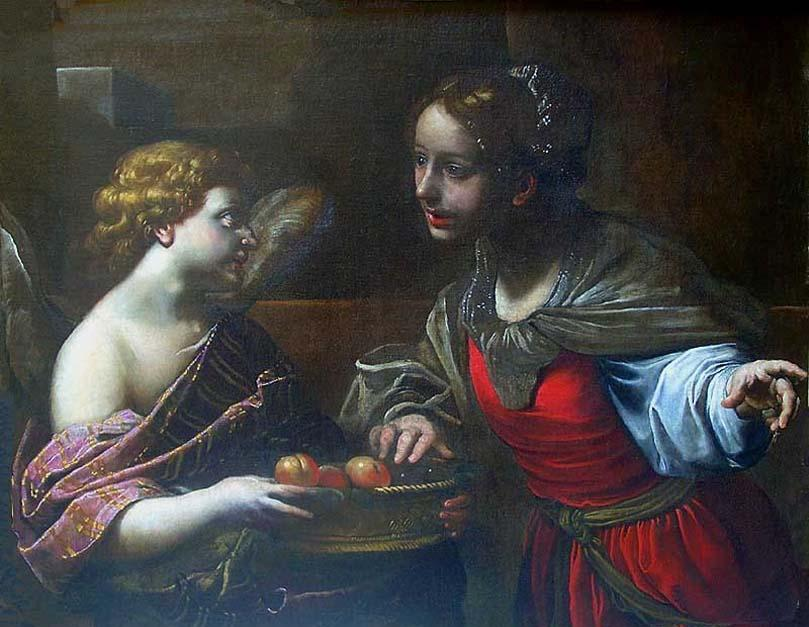
Saint Dorothy and the Angel by Alessandro Tiarini

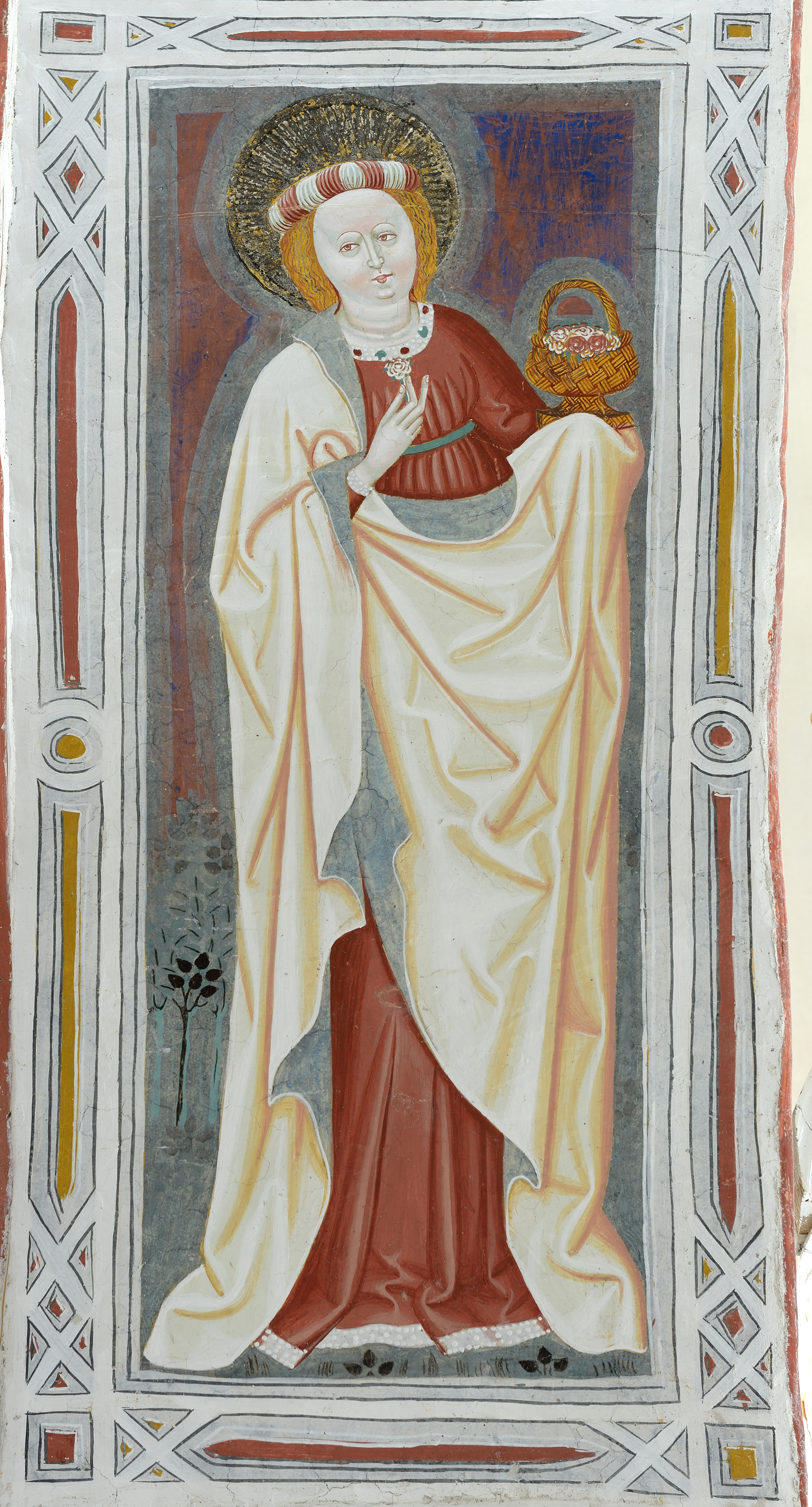
Fresco from anonymous painter 15th century Brixen school (Italy)

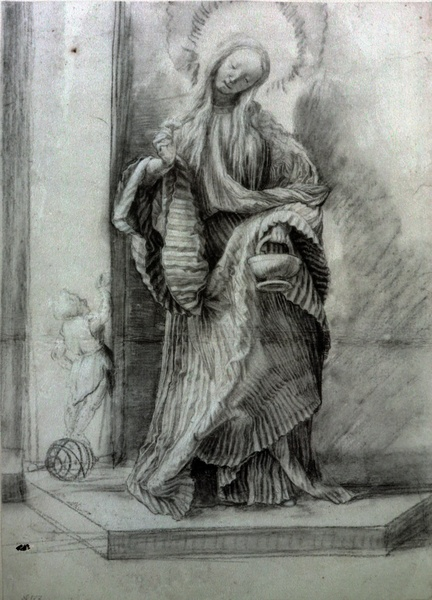
Drawing by Matthias Grünewald

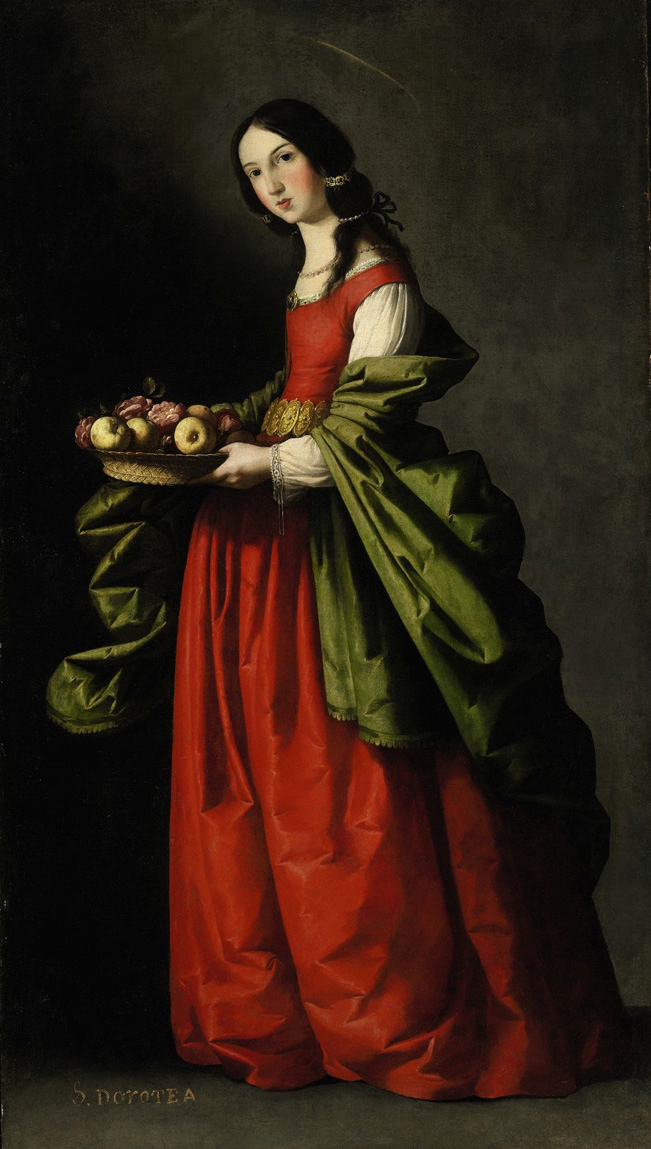
Santa Dorotea by Zurbaran

== See also ==
- Sainte-Dorothée, Quebec, a borough in Laval, Quebec, Canada
