= List of Christian martyrs =

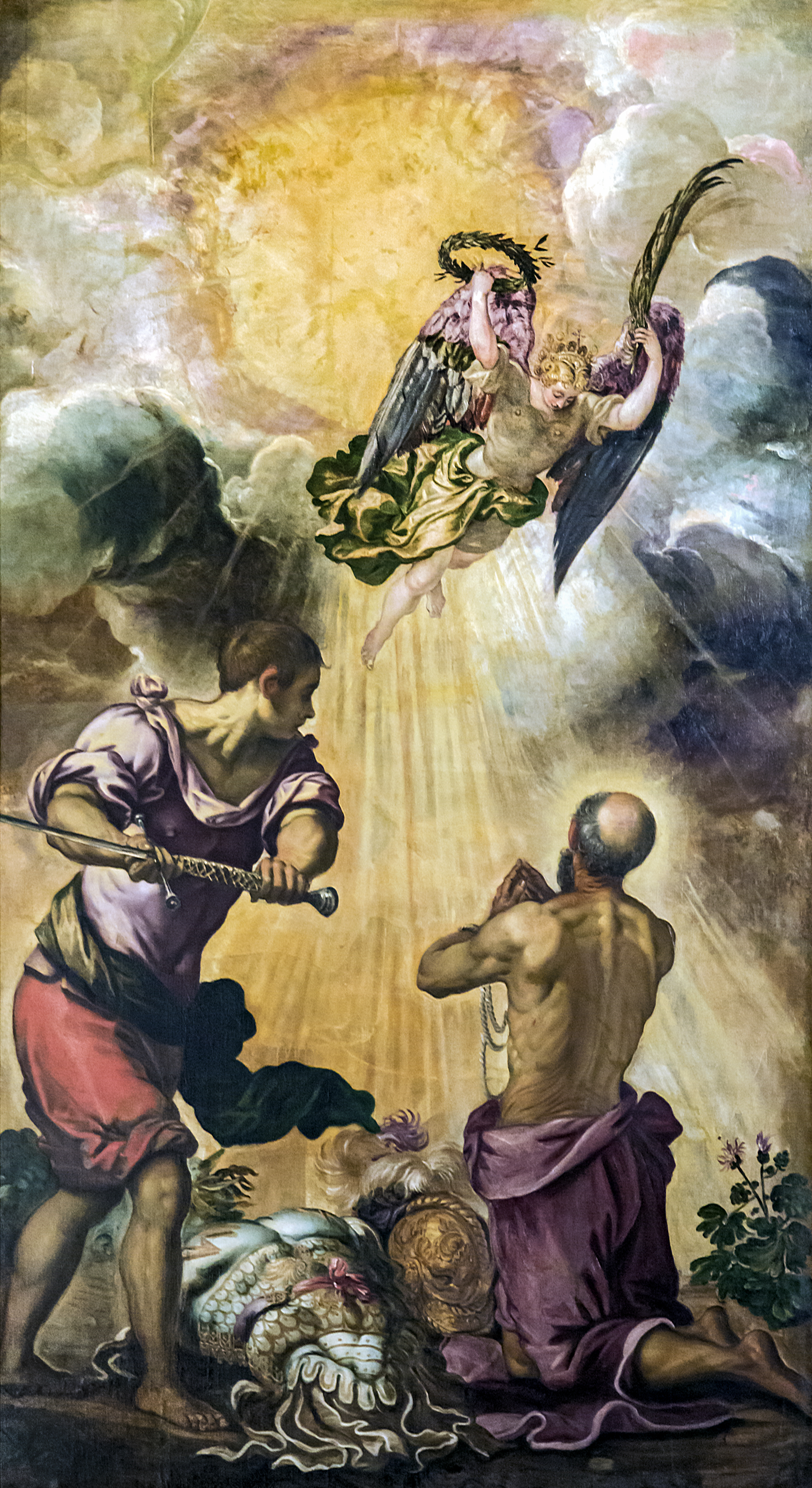
Martyrdom of St. Paul by Tintoretto

This is a list of reputed martyrs of Christianity; it includes only notable people with Wikipedia articles. Not all Christian confessions accept every figure on this list as a martyr or Christian—see the linked articles for fuller discussion. In many types of Christianity, martyrdom is considered a direct path to sainthood and many names on this list are viewed as saints in one or more confessions.

== Apostolic Age—1st century ==
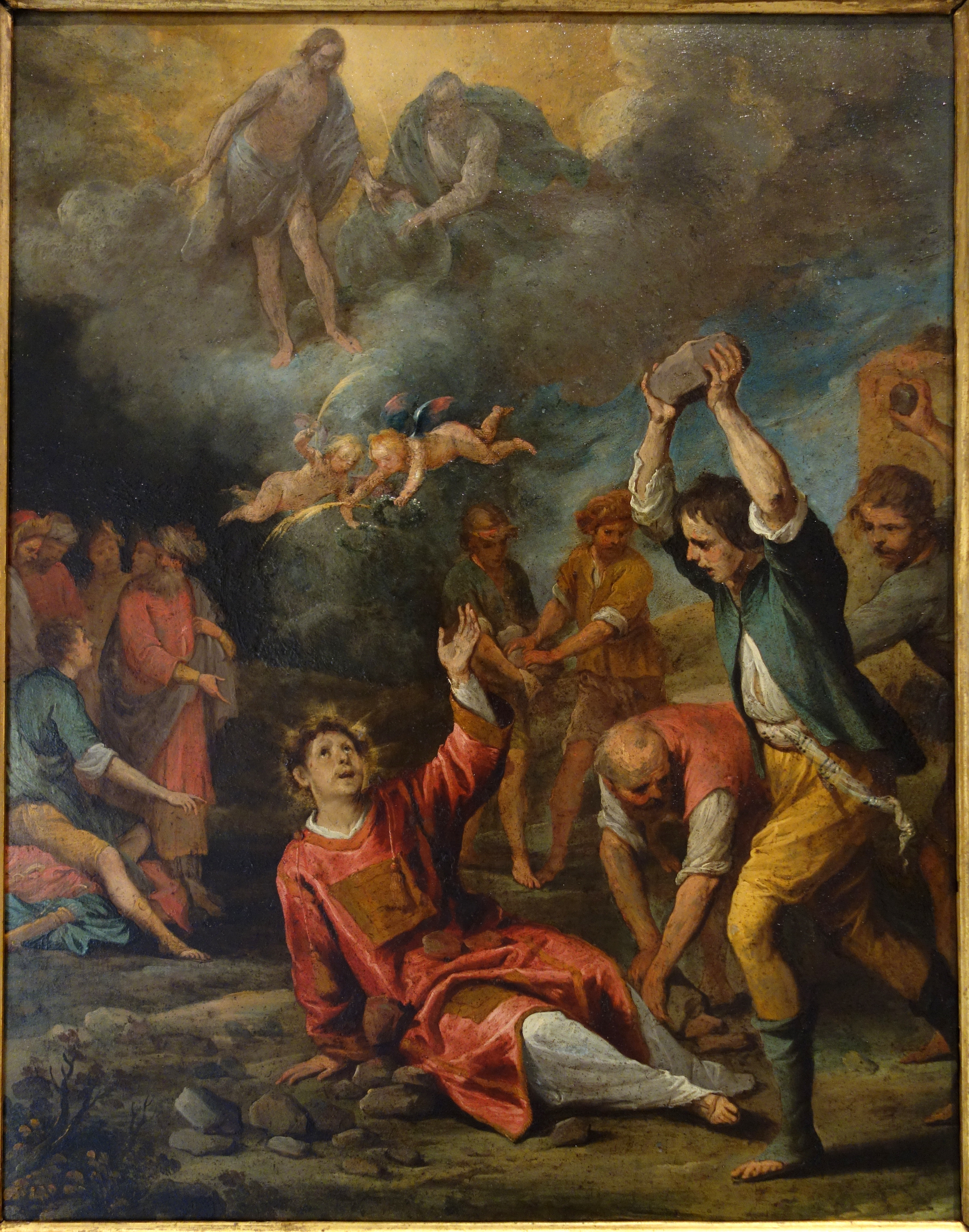
Martyrdom of Saint Stephen by Giovanni Andrea de Ferrari (1598-1669)

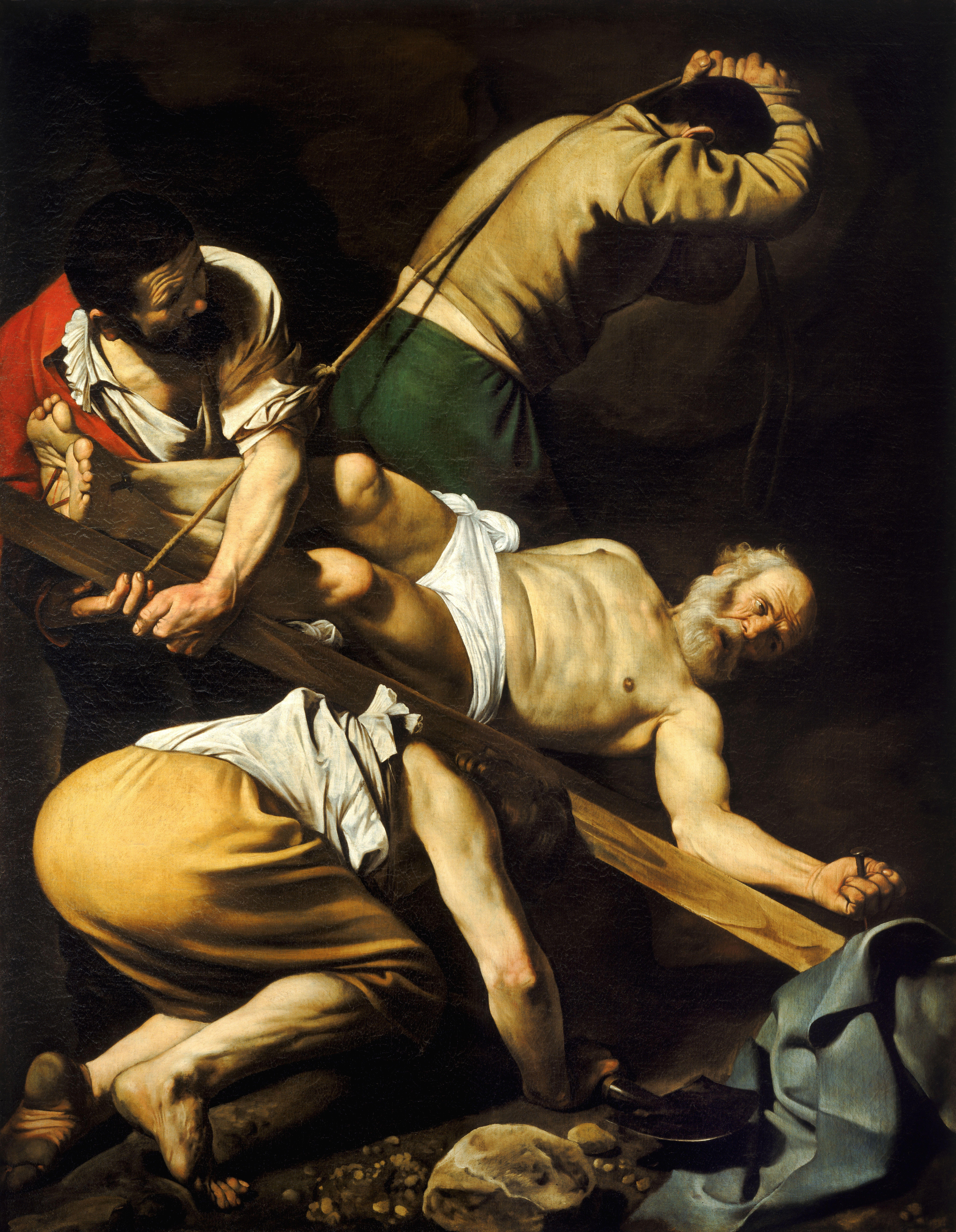
The crucifixion of Saint Peter by Caravaggio (1601)

=== According to the Gospels and Acts of the Apostles ===
- Holy Innocents of Bethlehem
- John the Baptist
- Stephen (Protomartyr)
- James, son of Zebedee
- Antipas

=== According to early sources ===
- James, brother of Jesus – attested by Josephus ca. AD 94
- Simon Peter, first attested by Tertullian about AD 200
- Paul the Apostle, first attested by Ignatius of Antioch probably about AD 110

=== According to tradition ===
- Andrew the Apostle
- Matthew the Apostle
- Philip the Apostle
- Thomas the Apostle
- Jude Thaddeus
- Bartholomew
- James, son of Alphaeus
- Barnabas
- Simon Zelotes
- Mark the Evangelist
- Luke the Evangelist
- Timothy
- Philemon

== Age of Martyrdom—2nd to 4th centuries ==
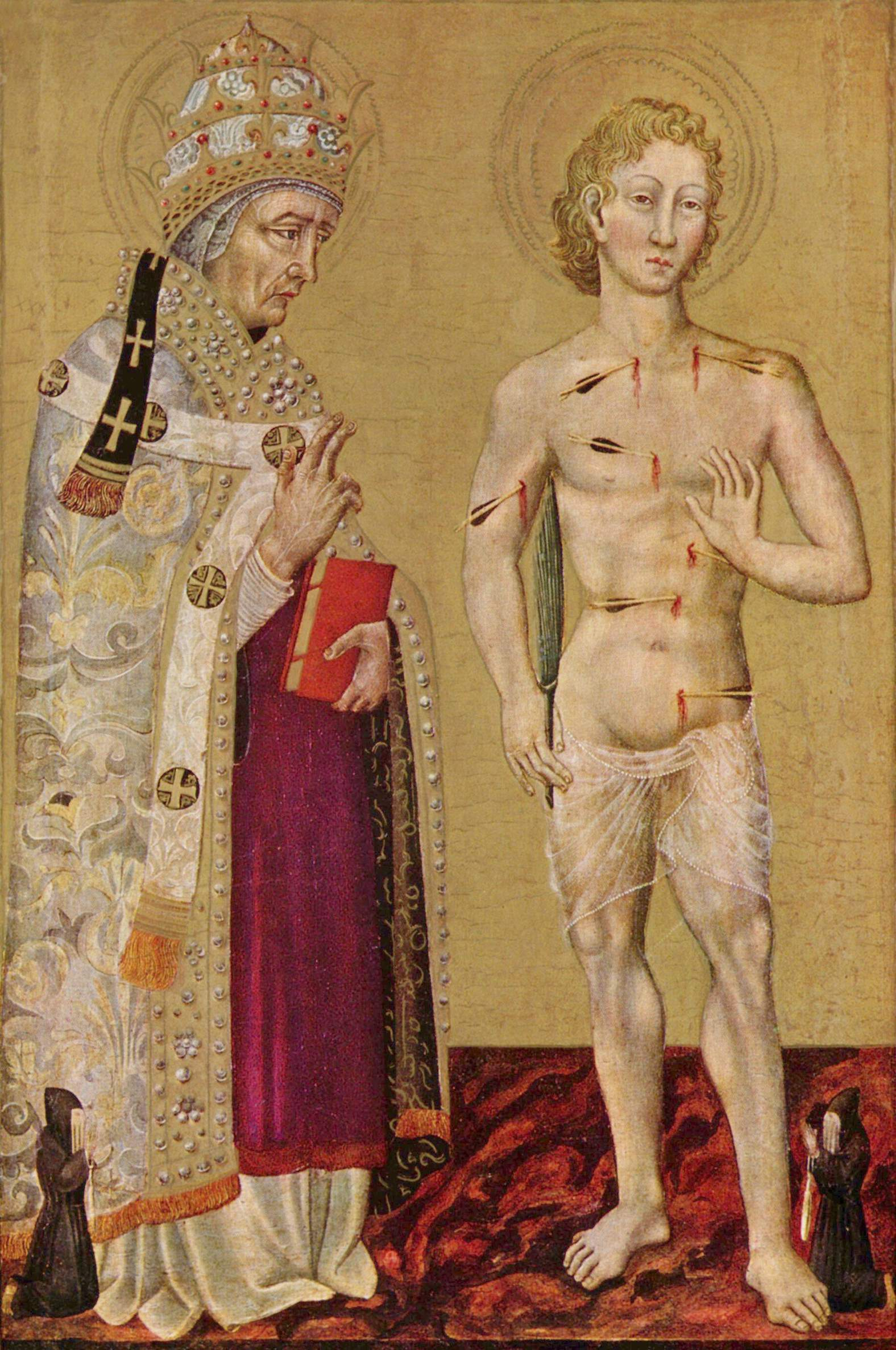
Pope St. Fabian and Saint Sebastian, Giovanni di Paolo

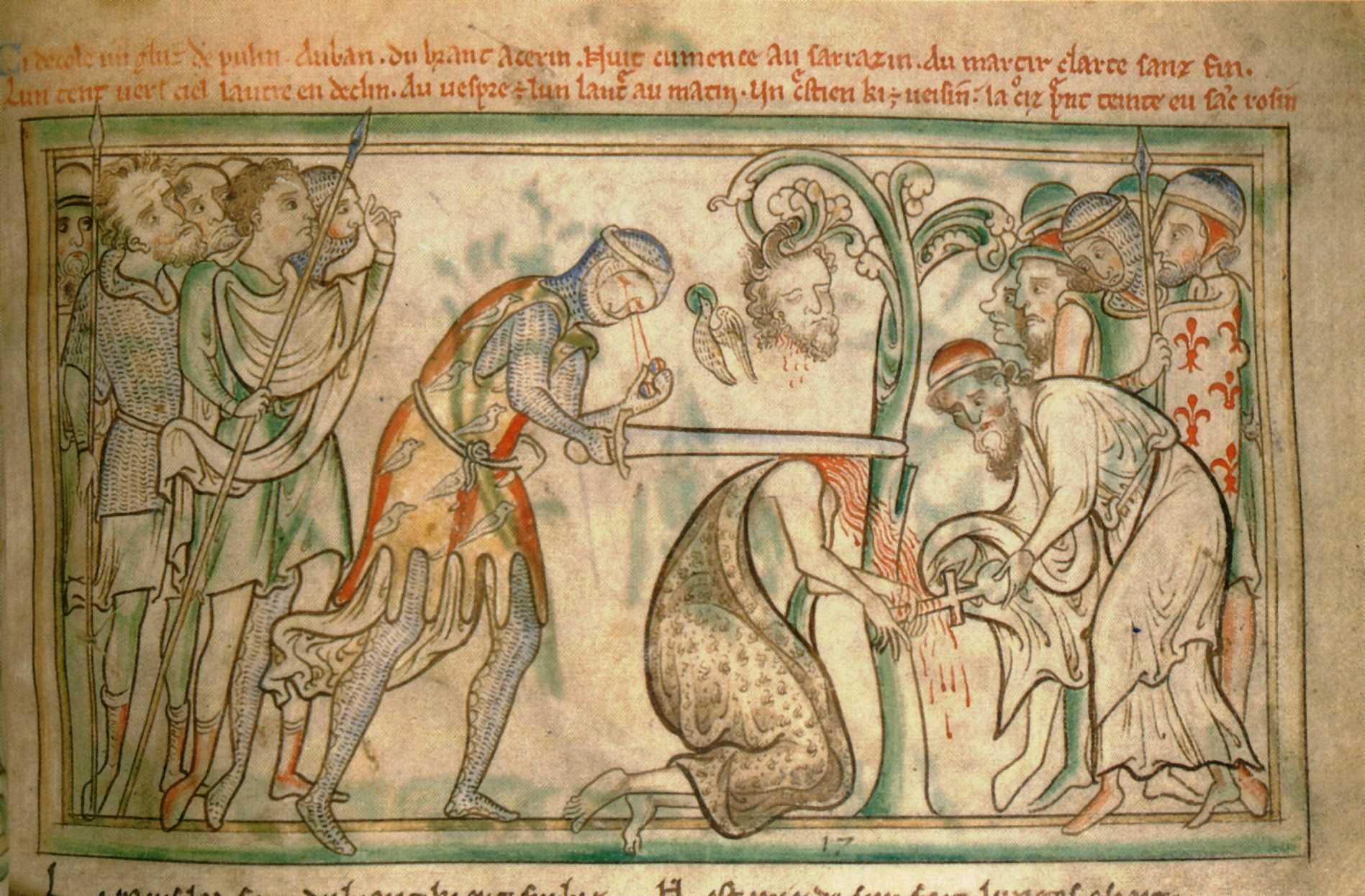
The martyrdom of St. Alban, from a 13th-century manuscript, now in the Trinity College Library, Dublin. Note the executioner's eyes falling out of his head

=== According to early Christian tradition ===
==== With some historical attestation within a hundred years of the event ====
- Polycarp of Smyrna
- Justin Martyr
- Scillitan Martyrs
- Perpetua and Felicity
- Ptolemaeus and Lucius
- Pothinus, bishop of Lyon, with Blandina and several others, the "Martyrs of Lyon and Vienne"
- Pope Fabian
- Sebastian
- Shmona and Gurya
- Agnes of Rome
- Felix and Adauctus
- Marcellinus and Peter
- Forty Martyrs of Sebaste
- Euphemia
- Cyprian
- Athenogenes of Pedachtoë

==== With some historical attestation more than a hundred years after the event ====
- Alban
- Ignatius of Antioch
- Gelasinus
- Lawrence of Rome
- Lucy
- Pancras
- Vincent of Saragossa
- Benedicta of Monacilioni
- Petronilla

=== Largely or wholly legendary ===
- Afra
- George
- Januarius
- Valentine
- Philomena
- Behnam
- Wilgefortis
- Cecilia
- Catherine of Alexandria
- Vitus the Martyr
- Pelagia of Tarsus
- Sophia the Martyr and her three daughters Faith, Hope and Charity

== Middle Ages—5th to 15th-centuries ==
.

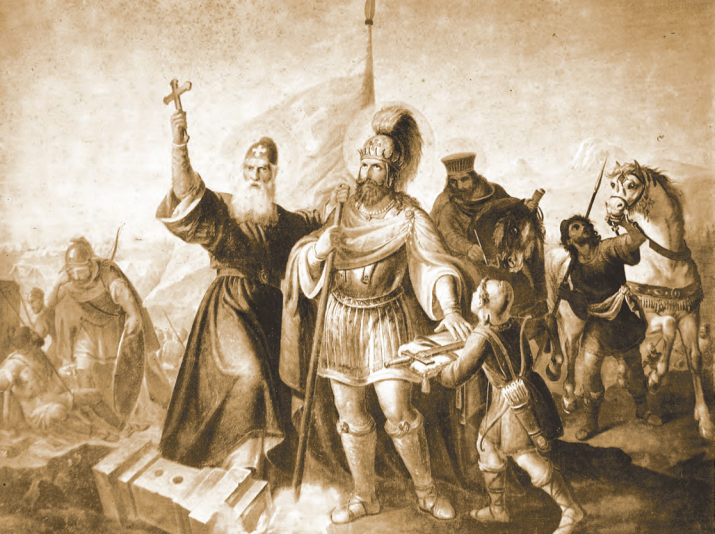
Drawing of Vardan Mamikonian with his soldiers during the Battle of Avarayr (451 AD), where he became a martyr.

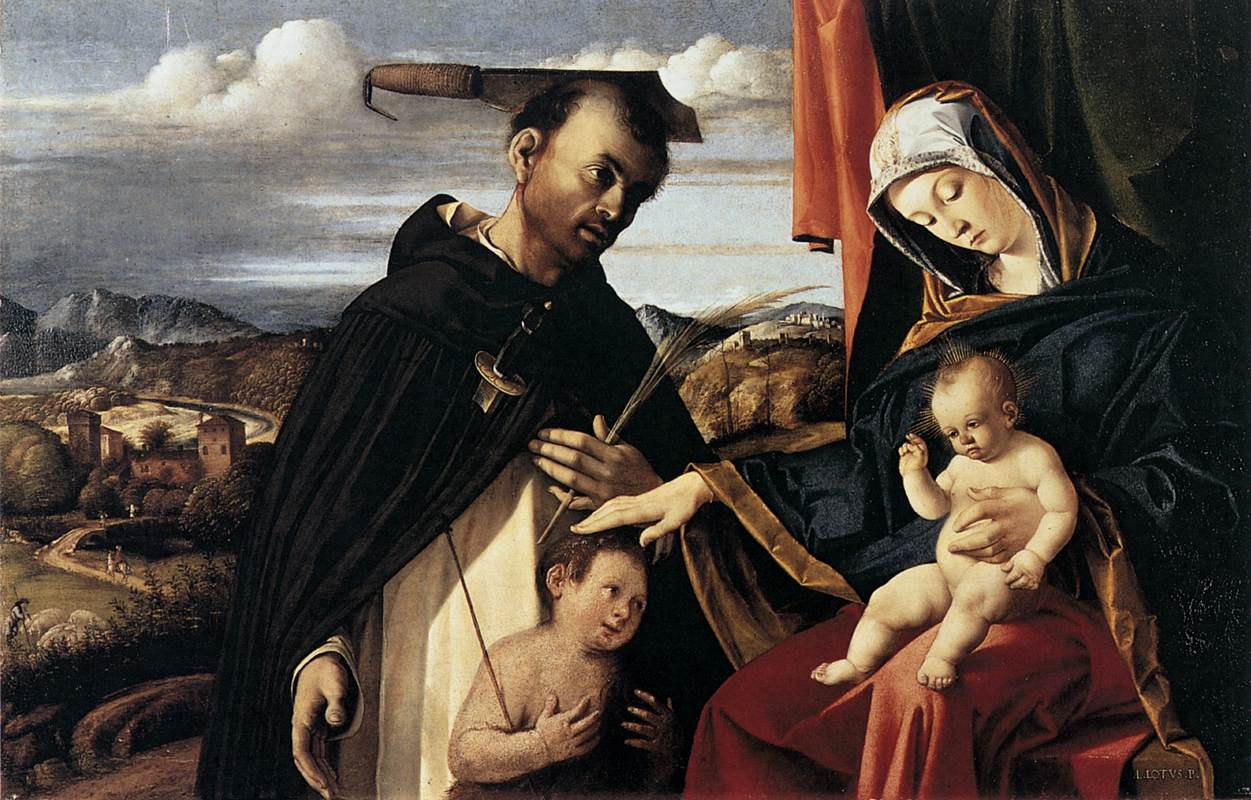
Madonna and Child with St Peter Martyr, by Lorenzo Lotto

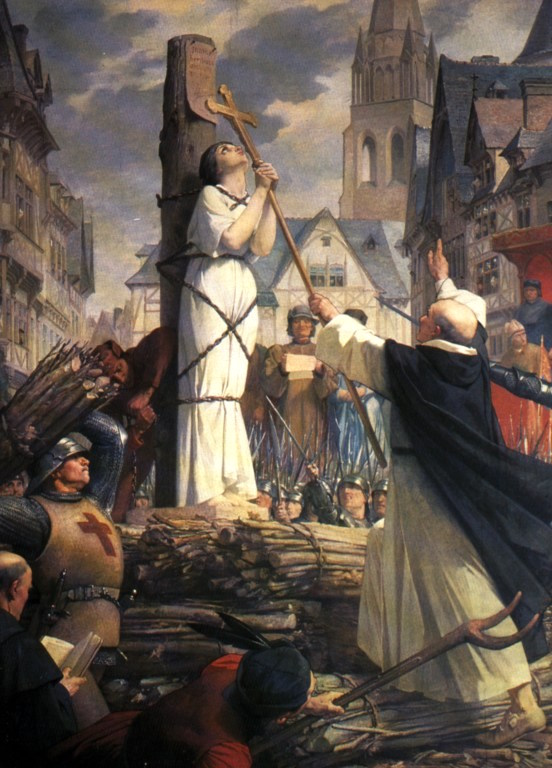
Joan of Arc being burned at the stake, by Jules-Eugène Lenepveu

- The nine children of Kola, 5th century
- Vardan Mamikonian, 451 in the Battle of Avarayr- First battle in defense of the Christian faith.
- Razhden the Protomartyr, 457
- Queen Shushanik, 475 AD
- Tewdrig, 6th c.
- Eustathius of Mtskheta, c. 550 AD
- Abibos of Nekresi, 6th century
- Boethius, 6th c.
- Sigismund of Burgundy, 524
- Edwin of Northumbria, 633 in the Battle of Hatfield Chase
- Oswald of Northumbria, 642 in the Battle of Maserfield
- Projectus of Clermont, 676
- Warinus of Poitiers, 677
- Dagobert II of the Franks, 676
- Kilian, Colman, and Totnan, 689
- Fructus, Valentine & Engratia of Segovia, c. 715
- Theofrid of Orange, 728/-32 by Saracens
- Porcarius of Lérins, c. 732 by Saracens
- Boniface, 754.
- Abo of Tbilisi, 786
- Æthelberht II of East Anglia, 794
- Martyrs of Iona, 806 by Vikings
- Gohard of Nantes, 843 by Normans
- Roderick, Eulogius, Perfectus, Laura, Flora and Maria, Aurelius and Natalia, Nunilo and Alodia, and other Martyrs of Cordoba, 850-59
- Bertharius of Monte Cassino, 883 by Saracens
- Edmund of East Anglia, 869.
- Ludmila of Bohemia, 921
- Wiborada of St. Gall, 921 by Magyars
- Wenceslaus I, Duke of Bohemia, 935
- King Edward the Martyr, 979.
- Adalbert of Prague, 997 by Old Prussians
- Bruno of Querfurt, 1009
- Jovan Vladimir, 1014
- Olaf II of Norway, 1030 in the Battle of Stiklestad
- Gerard of Csanád, 1046
- Stanislaus of Szczepanów, 1079
- Canute IV of Denmark, 1086
- Magnus Erlendsson of Orkney, 1117
- William of Norwich, 1144 (cult suppressed)
- Eric IX of Sweden, 1161
- Thomas Becket, 1170 - The most famous martyr of the Middle Ages.
- Berard of Carbio and companions, 1220
- Serapion of Algiers, 1240
- Buzád Hahót, 1241
- Peter of Verona, 1252 by Cathars - Canonized 11 months after his death; the fastest in history.
- Martyrs of Sandomierz, 1260
- Antonio Pavoni, 1374 by Waldensians
- Tsar Lazar, 1389
- Nicholas Tavelic, 1391
- John of Nepomuk, 1393
- Jan Huss (1415) and Jerome of Prague (1416) - executed for heresy by the Roman Catholic Council of Constance
- Joan of Arc, 1431, French heroine
- Girolamo Savonarola, 1498

== Reformation Era—16th century ==
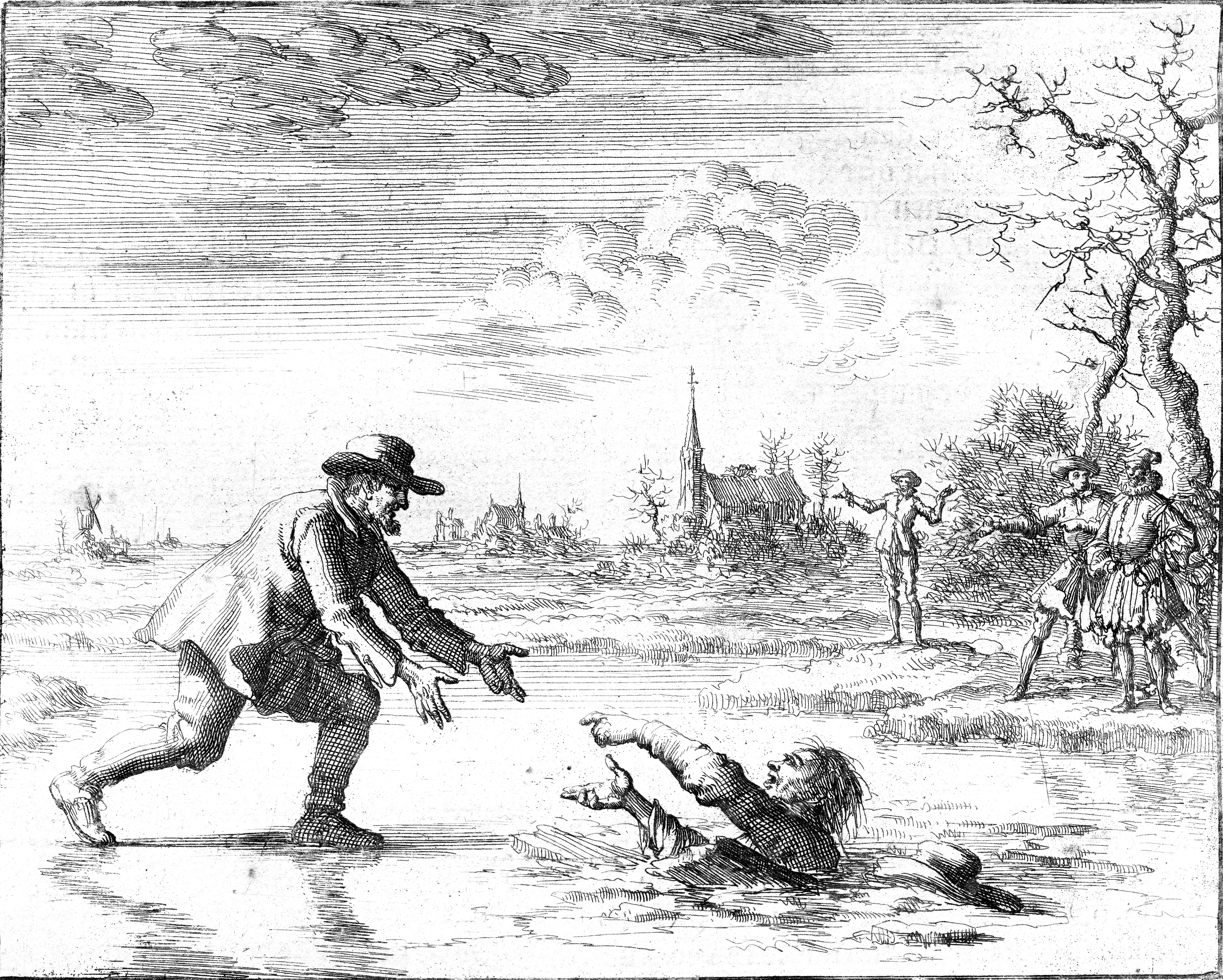
Dirk Willems etching from Martyrs Mirror

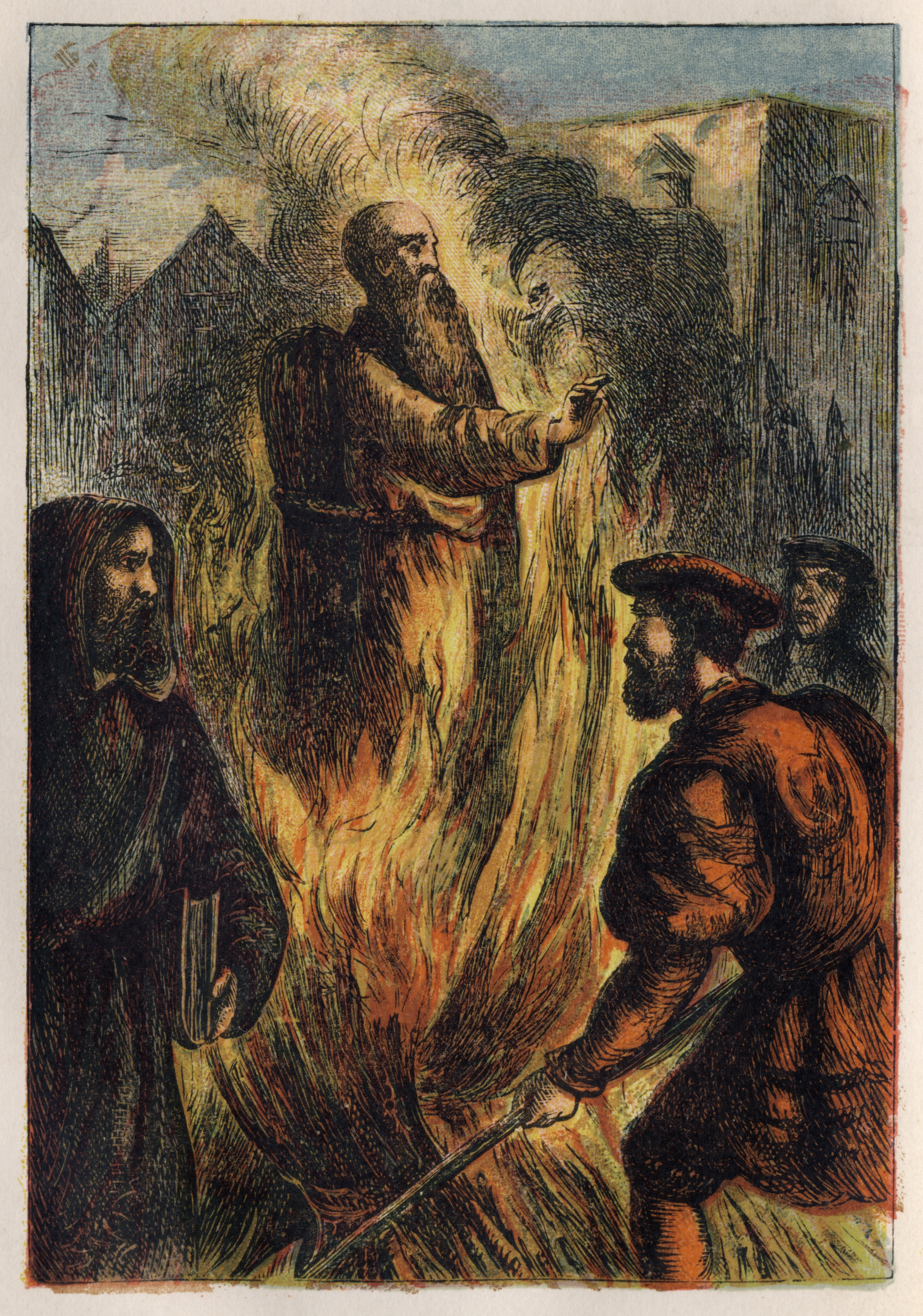
"Death of Cranmer", from the 1887 Foxe's Book of Martyrs

- Jan van Essen and Hendrik Vos, 1523, burned at the stake, early Lutheran martyrs
- Jan de Bakker, 1525, burned at the stake
- Martyrs of Tlaxcala, 1527-1529
- Felix Manz, 1527
- Patrick Hamilton, 1528, burned at the stake, early Lutheran martyr
- George Blaurock, 1529
- Thomas More, 1535, executed
- John Fisher, 1535
- William Tyndale, 1536
- Carthusian Martyrs, 1535–1537
- Arthur of Glastonbury, 1539
- Margaret Pole, 1541
- Juan de Padilla, Spanish missionary to New Mexico, 1542
- Mannar Catholic martyrs (1544)
- Anne Askew, 1546
- George Wishart, 1546
- Luis de Cancer, Spanish missionary to La Florida, 1549
- Lady Jane Grey, 1554
- Hugh Latimer, 1555
- Nicholas Ridley, 1555
- Rowland Taylor, 1555
- John Hooper, 1555
- John Rogers, 1555
- William Hunter, 1555
- Lawrence Saunders, 1555
- Thomas Cranmer, 1556
- Gonçalo da Silveira, 1561
- Guido de Bres, 1567
- Dirk Willems, 1569
- The Fifty Two Martyrs of Brazil, 1570-1571, including:
  - Inácio de Azevedo, 1570
  - Pero Dias, 1571
- Martyrs of Gorkum, 1572, including:
  - Andrew Wouters
  - Nicholas Pieck
  - John of Cologne
- Edmund Campion, 1581
- Margaret Ball, 1584
- The Forty Martyrs of England and Wales, various dates

== Modern Era—17th to 21st centuries ==
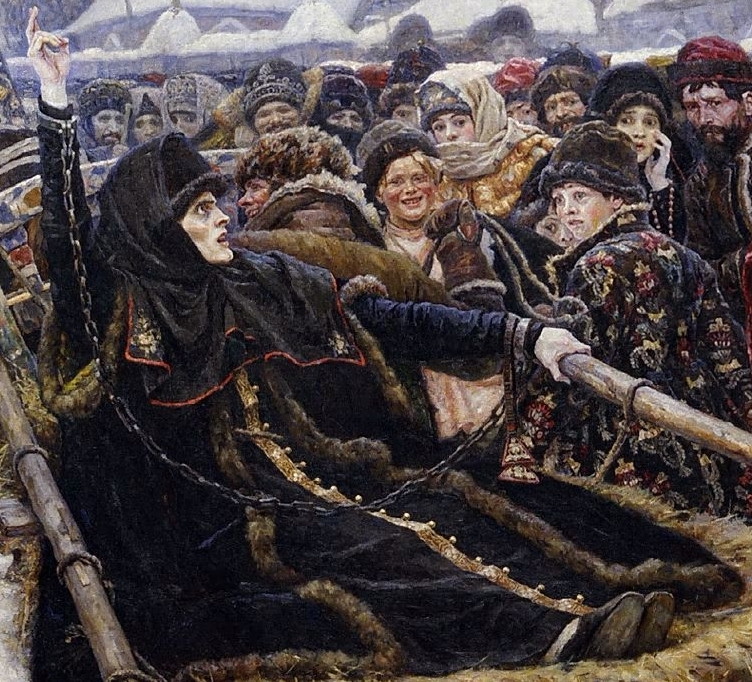
Feodosia Morozova, an Old Believer being arrested by Czarist authorities

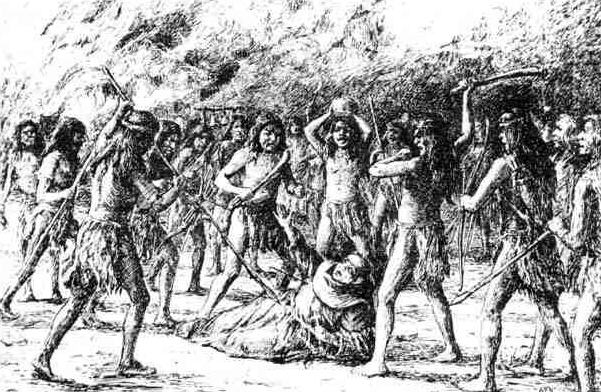
An illustration depicts the brutal death of Father Luís Jayme by the hands of angry natives at Mission San Diego de Alcalá in Alta California, November 4, 1775

- Martyrs of Japan, 1597-1639, (see also Kakure Kirishitan)
- Francis Taylor, 1621
- Ketevan the Martyr, 1624
- Vietnamese Martyrs, 1625 - 1886
- Magdalene of Nagasaki, 1634
- Lorenzo Ruiz, 1637
- Canadian Martyrs, North American Martyrs, 1642–1649
- Arthur Bell, 1643
- Martyrs of Natal 1645, including:
  - André de Soveral
  - Ambrósio Francisco Ferro
  - Mateus Moreira
- Isaac Jogues, 1646
- John de Britto, 1647–1693, born in Portugal and beheaded in India
- Francis Ferdinand de Capillas, 1648, missionary to China
- Diego Luis de San Vitores, and Pedro Calungsod, 1672
- Feodosia Morozova, 1675, Russian Old Believer
- Oliver Plunkett, 1681, Archbishop of Armagh
- Felipe Songsong, 1685
- Devasahayam Pillai, 1712-1752
- Constantin Brâncoveanu, 1714
- Jean-Pierre Aulneau, Jean Baptiste de La Vérendrye, and 19 other voyageurs, 1736
- Vicente Liem de la Paz, 1773
- Luís Jayme, Spanish missionary to Alta California, 1775
- Cosmas of Aetolia, 1779
- Francisco Garcés, Spanish missionary to Alta California, 1781
- Martyrs of Compiegne, 1794
- Andrés Quintana, Spanish missionary to Alta California, 1812
- Chinese Martyrs (various Christian denominations), 19th and 20th centuries
- Pedro Marieluz Garces, 1825
- Tārore, 1836
- Andrew Dung-Lac, 1839, Vietnamese Catholic
- Joseph Smith, 1844
- Hyrum Smith, 1844
- Korean Martyrs, 1839, 1846, 1866
- Peter Chanel, 1841
- Andrew Kim Taegon, 1846
- Marcus Whitman, Narcissa Whitman, and companions, 1847
- The Massabki Brothers, 1860
- Lucy Yi Zhenmei, one of the 19th century Chinese Catholic Martyrs, 1862
- Thomas Baker, 1867, English missionary killed and eaten, Fiji
- Martyrs of the Paris Commune, 1871
- The Martyrs of Mbokotwana, 1880
- Martyrs of Uganda, 1885–1887
- Victor Emilio Moscoso Cárdenas, 1897
- Amandina of Schakkebroek, 1900
- Maria Goretti, 1902, died defending herself from being raped
- Karolina Kózka, 1914
- Armenian Martyrs, 1915-1923
- Grand Duchess Elizabeth Fyodorovna, 1918
- Tsar Nicholas II of Russia and Family, 1918
- Nun Barbara (Yakovleva), 1918
- James Coyle, 1921
- Gregory of Cydonia, 1922
- Manuel Gómez González, 1924
- Adílio Daronch, 1924
- Saints of the Cristero War 1926–1927, including:
  - Miguel Pro, 1927
  - Cristóbal Magallanes Jara, 1927
  - Mateo Correa Magallanes, 1927
- Toribio Romo González, 1928
- Manche Masemola, 1913–1928
- José Sánchez del Río 1928
- Albertina Berkenbrock, 1931
- Innocencio of Mary Immaculate, 1934
- John and Betty Stam, 1934
- Antonia Mesina, 1935
- Bartolome Blanco Marquez, 1936
- Martyrs of the Spanish Civil War 1934, 1936–1939
- Alexander Hotovitzky, 1937
- Peter of Jesus Maldonado, 1937
- Paul Schneider (pastor), 1939
- Martyrs of Songkhon, 1940
- Maximilian Kolbe, 1941, murdered in Auschwitz
- Benigna Cardoso da Silva, 1941
- Edith Stein, 1942, murdered in Auschwitz
- Gorazd, 1942, Bishop of Prague
- Lucian Tapiedi, 1942
- Franz Jägerstätter, 1943
- Sophie Scholl, 1921-1943, a devout Lutheran executed by the Nazis for her anti-Nazi activism
- Maria Restituta Kafka, 1943
- Józef and Wiktoria Ulma with seven children, 1944
- Giuseppe Beotti, 1944
- Anna Kolesárová, 1944
- Dusty Miller, 1945, a Methodist layman killed in a World War II Japanese administered POW camp in Thailand
- Marcel Callo, 1945
- Dietrich Bonhoeffer, 1945, Lutheran pastor and member of the German Resistance
- Rolando Rivi, fourteen-year-old seminarian, 1945
- Peter To Rot, 1945
- Vincentas Borisevičius, 1946
- Martyrs of Albania, 1945-1974
- Theodore Romzha, 1947, Ruthenian Eparch of Mukachevo
- Nykyta Budka, 1949, Ukrainian Bishop of Canada, died in Soviet gulag
- Beda Chang, 1951
- Alberto Hurtado, 1952
- Francis Xavier Ford, 1952
- Petro Pavlo Oros, 1953
- Mečislovas Reinys, 1953
- Martyrs of Laos, 1954-1970
- Zdenka Cecilia Schelingová, 1955
- Jim Elliot, 1956
- Nate Saint, 1956, killed while attempting to evangelize the Waodani people
- Ed McCully, 1956
- Pete Fleming, 1956
- Roger Youderian, 1956
- Pierina Morosini, 1957
- Veronica Antal, 1958
- Esther John 1929–1960, Found Killed in Chichawatni commemorated at Westminster Abbey.
- Marie-Clémentine Anuarite Nengapeta,
- Wang Zhiming, 1973, Chinese pastor, publicly executed
- Martyrs of La Rioja, 1976
- Janani Jakaliya Luwum, 1977, Archbishop of Uganda
- Abuna Theophilos, 1979, Patriarch of the Ethiopian Orthodox Tewahedo Church
- Gudina Tumsa, 1979, Ethiopian theologian
- Óscar Romero, 1980, Archbishop of San Salvador
- Luís Espinal Camps, 1980, Jesuit priest
- Ita Ford, 1980
- Maura Clarke, 1980
- Dorothy Kazel, 1980
- Jean Donovan, 1980
- Stanley Rother, 1981
- Isabel Cristina Mrad Campos, 1982
- Jerzy Popiełuszko, 1984
- Santa Scorese, 1991
- Marta Obregón Rodríguez, 1992
- Lindalva Justo de Oliveira, 1993
- Martyrs of Algeria, 1994-1996
- Rani Maria Vattalil, 1995
- 19 martyrs of Algeria, 1996
- Graham Staines, 1999, in India
- Kosheh Martyrs, 1998–2000, Egypt
- Maria Laura Mainetti, 2000, Catholic nun murdered in a satanic ritual
- Rufus Halley, 2001
- David Paget, 2001
- Martin Burnham, 2002
- Mary Stachowicz, 2002
- Dorothy Mae Stang, 2005
- Andrea Santoro, 2006
- Fabianus Tibo, 2006
- Leonella Sgorbati, 2006
- Ragheed Ganni and companions, 2007
- Paulos Faraj Rahho, 2008, Chaldean Archeparch of Mosul
- Nicholas Pillai Pakiaranjith, 2008
- 2008 Kandhamal violence, 2008
- Vivian Uchechi Ogu, 2009
- Nag Hammadi martyrs, Egypt 2010
- Baghdad martyrs, 2010
- Luigi Padovese, 2011
- Shahbaz Bhatti, 2011
- Nigerian martyrs, 2012
- Frans van der Lugt, 2014
- Christians (ن) martyred by ISIL, 2014-2019
- 21 Coptic Martyrs of Libya, 2015
- Akash Bashir, 2015
- Jacques Hamel, Normandy 2016
- Cairo martyrs, 2016
- Alexandria martyrs, 2017
- Sutherland Springs martyrs, 2017
- Sri Lankan martyrs, 2019
- Owo martyrs, 2022
- Plateau martyrs, 2023
- Damascus martyrs (2025), 2025
- Ashur Sarnaya, 2025

== See also ==
- List of Christian women of the patristic age
- List of Christians killed during the Diocletian Persecution
- Unitarian martyrs
