= Gelasinus =

Christian martyr and saint

Gelasinus (Ancient Greek: Γελασινος, Gelasinos; d. AD 297) was a reputed Christian martyr and saint. His feast day is observed on August 26.

Gelasinus was said to have been a Roman "second mime" from Mariamme near Damascus. He converted in the middle of a theatrical contest at Heliopolis (the modern Baalbek, Lebanon). During a group skit lampooning the sacrament of baptism, he was thrown into a vat of warm water from the bathhouse and emerged refusing to continue the routine, saying "I am a Christian for I saw an awesome glory in the tub and I will die a Christian". Heliopolis was a center of zealous Roman and Canaanite paganism and the audience became enraged, taking him outside and stoning him. His kin and other Christians took his body and erected a chapel in his honor in their village.

His story is attested by the 7th-century Easter Chronicle in a hagiography of doubtful historicity, although it may preserve an authentic tradition.

== See also ==
- List of Christian martyrs
