= Hagiography =

Biography of a saint or religious figure

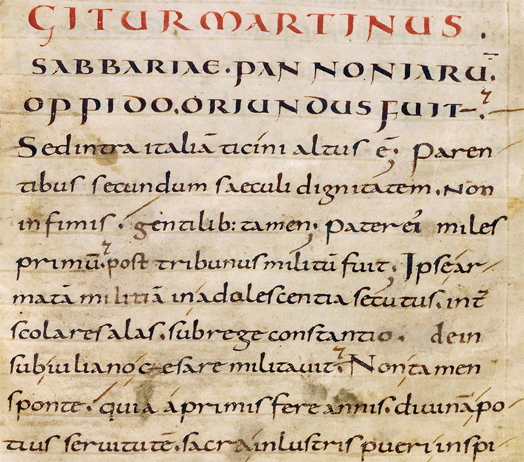
Page from Vita Sancti Martini by Sulpicius Severus

A hagiography (/ˌhæɡiˈɒɡrəfi/ HAG-ee-OG-rə-fee; from Ancient Greek ἅγιος (hágios) 'holy' and -γραφία (-graphía) 'writing') is a biography of a saint or an ecclesiastical leader, as well as, by extension, an adulatory and idealised biography of a preacher, priest, founder, saint, monk, nun or icon in any of the world's religions. Early Christian hagiographies might consist of a biography or vita (Latin for 'life', which begins the title of most medieval biographies), a description of the saint's deeds or miracles, an account of the saint's martyrdom (called a passio), or be a combination of these.

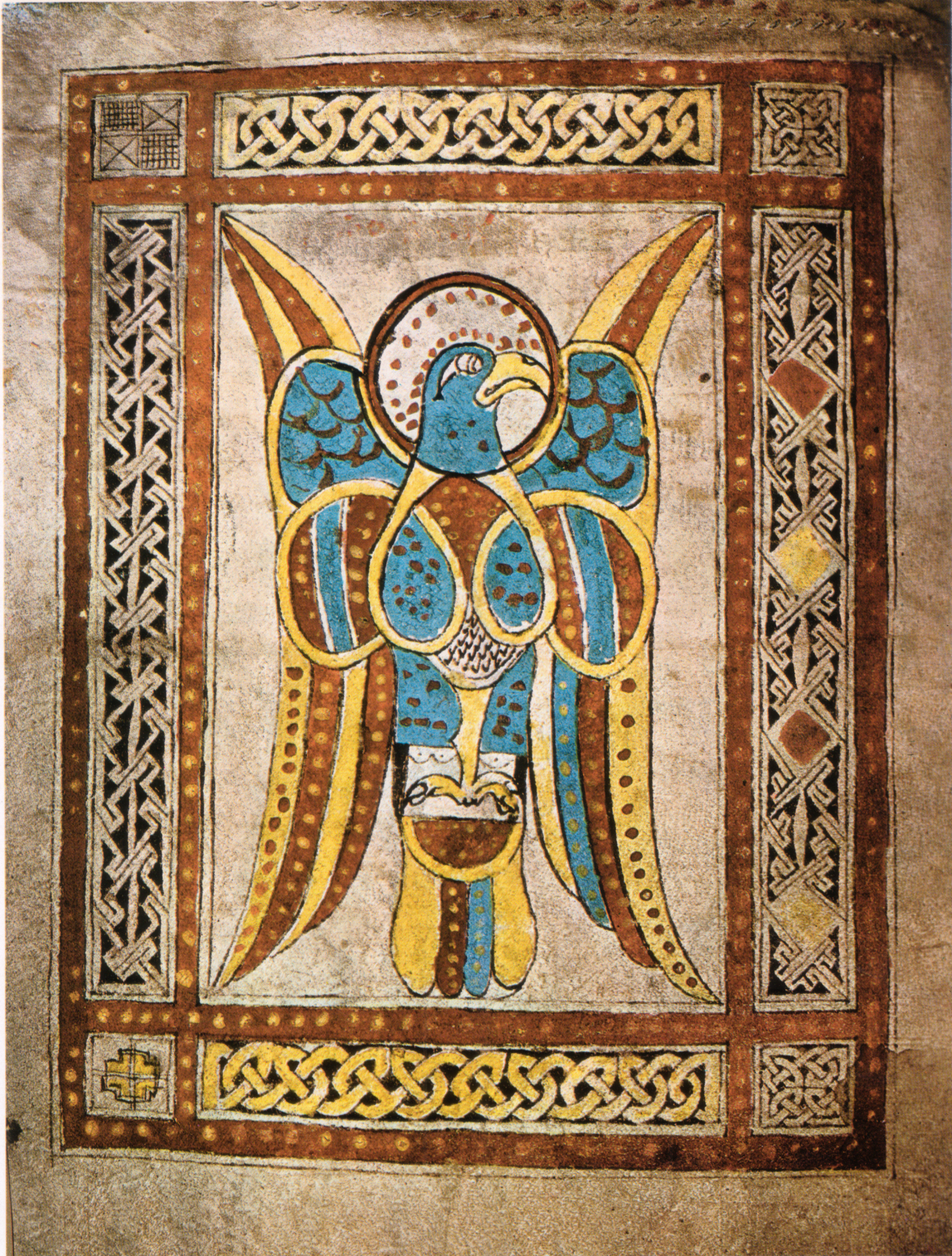
The Eagle symbol of St John the Evangelist from the Book of Dimma folio 104v (Dublin, Trinity College, MS.A.IV.23)

Christian hagiographies focus on the lives, and notably the miracles, ascribed to men and women canonized by the Roman Catholic church, the Eastern Orthodox Church, the Oriental Orthodox churches, and the Church of the East. Other religious traditions such as Buddhism, Hinduism, Taoism, Islam, Sikhism and Jainism also create and maintain hagiographical texts (such as the Sikh Janamsakhis) concerning saints, gurus and other individuals believed to be imbued with sacred power.

When referring to modern, non-ecclesiastical works, the term hagiography is often used today as a pejorative reference to biographies and histories whose authors are perceived to be uncritical or excessively reverential toward their subject.

Hagiographic works, especially those of the Middle Ages, can incorporate a record of institutional and local history, and evidence of popular cults, customs, and traditions.

== Christianity ==
=== Development ===
Hagiography constituted an important literary genre in the early Christian church, providing some informational history along with the more inspirational stories and legends. A hagiographic account of an individual saint could consist of a biography (vita), a description of the saint's deeds or miracles, an account of the saint's martyrdom (passio), or be a combination of these.

The genre of lives of the saints first came into being in the Roman Empire as legends about Christian martyrs were recorded. The dates of their deaths formed the basis of martyrologies. In the 4th century, there were three main types of catalogs of lives of the saints:

- annual calendar catalogue, or menaion (in Greek, μηναῖον, menaion means "monthly" (adj, neut), lit. "lunar"), biographies of the saints to be read at sermons;
- synaxarion ("something that collects"; Greek συναξάριον, from σύναξις, synaxis i.e. "gathering", "collection", "compilation"), or a short version of lives of the saints, arranged by dates;
- paterikon ("that of the Fathers"; Greek πατερικόν; in Greek and Latin, pater means "father"), or biography of the specific saints, chosen by the catalog compiler.

The earliest lives of saints focused on desert fathers who lived as ascetics from the 4th century onwards. The life of Anthony of Egypt is usually considered the first example of this new genre of Christian biography.

In Western Europe, hagiography was one of the more important vehicles for the study of inspirational history during the Middle Ages. The Golden Legend of Jacobus de Voragine compiled a great deal of medieval hagiographic material, with a strong emphasis on miracle tales. Lives were often written to promote the cult of local or national states, and in particular to develop pilgrimages to visit relics. The bronze Gniezno Doors of Gniezno Cathedral in Poland are the only Romanesque doors in Europe to feature the life of a saint. The life of Saint Adalbert of Prague, who is buried in the cathedral, is shown in 18 scenes, probably based on a lost illuminated copy of one of his Lives.

The Bollandist Society continues the study, academic assembly, appraisal and publication of materials relating to the lives of Christian saints (see Acta Sanctorum).

=== Medieval England ===
Many of the important hagiographical texts composed in medieval England were written in the vernacular dialect Anglo-Norman. With the introduction of Latin literature into England in the 7th and 8th centuries the genre of the life of the saint grew increasingly popular. When one contrasts it to the popular heroic poem, such as Beowulf, one finds that they share certain common features. In Beowulf, the titular character battles against Grendel and his mother, while the saint, such as Athanasius' Anthony (one of the original sources for the hagiographic motif) or the character of Guthlac, battles against figures no less substantial in a spiritual sense. Both genres then focus on the hero-warrior figure, but with the distinction that the saint is of a spiritual sort.

Imitation of the life of Christ was then the benchmark against which saints were measured, and imitation of the lives of saints was the benchmark against which the general population measured itself. In Anglo-Saxon and medieval England, hagiography became a literary genre par excellence for the teaching of a largely illiterate audience. Hagiography provided priests and theologians with classical handbooks in a form that allowed them the rhetorical tools necessary to present their faith through the example of the saints' lives.

Of all the English hagiographers, no one was more prolific nor so aware of the importance of the genre as Abbot Ælfric of Eynsham. His work Lives of the Saints contains set of sermons on saints' days, formerly observed by the English Church. The text comprises two prefaces, one in Latin and one in Old English, and 39 lives beginning on 25 December with the nativity of Christ and ending with three texts to which no saints' days are attached. The text spans the entire year and describes the lives of many saints, both English and continental, and harks back to some of the earliest saints of the early church.

There are two known instances where saint's lives were adapted into vernacular plays in Britain. These are the Cornish-language works Beunans Meriasek and Beunans Ke, about the lives of Saints Meriasek and Kea, respectively.

Other examples of hagiographies from England include:

- the Chronicle by Hugh Candidus
- the Secgan Manuscript
- the list of John Leyland
- possibly the book Life by Saint Cadog
- Vita Sancti Ricardi Episcopi et Confessoris Cycestrensis/ Life of Richard of Chichester by Ralph Bocking.
- The Book of Margery Kempe is an example of autohagiography, in which the subject dictates her life using the hagiographic form.

=== Medieval Ireland ===
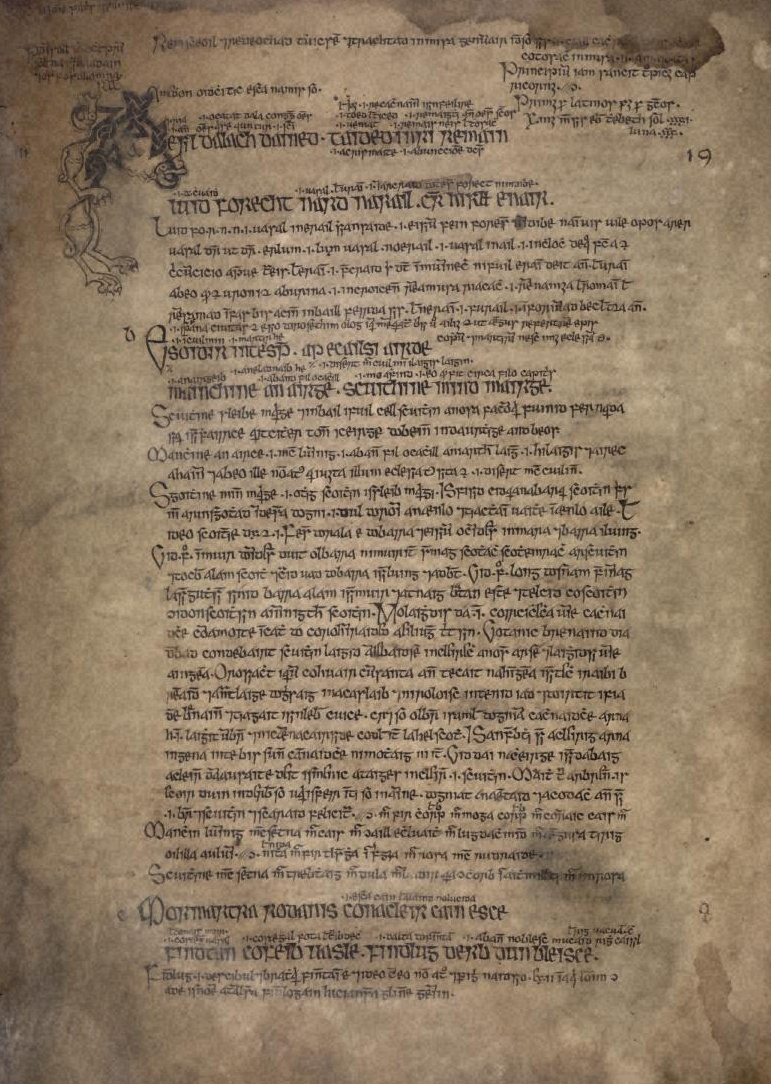
Calendar entries for 1 and 2 January of the Martyrology of Oengus

Ireland is notable in its rich hagiographical tradition, and for the large amount of material which was produced during the Middle Ages. Irish hagiographers wrote primarily in Latin while some of the later saint's lives were written in the hagiographer's native vernacular Irish. Of particular note are the lives of St. Patrick, St. Columba (Latin)/Colum Cille (Irish) and St. Brigit/Brigid—Ireland's three patron saints. The earliest extant Life was written by Cogitosus. Additionally, several Irish calendars relating to the feastdays of Christian saints (sometimes called martyrologies or feastologies) contained abbreviated synopses of saint's lives, which were compiled from many different sources. Notable examples include the Martyrology of Tallaght and the Félire Óengusso. Such hagiographical calendars were important in establishing lists of native Irish saints, in imitation of continental calendars.

=== Eastern Orthodoxy ===
==== Georgia ====
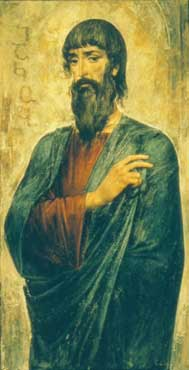

Jacob of Tsurtavi, the author of the Martyrdom of the Holy Queen Shushanik

Hagiography played a vital role in Georgian literature. It create a need to develop a Georgian alphabet which would fit the Georgian language so the peasantry could get to know about the biographies of Saints and martyrs. The Passion of Saint Shushanik , written in c. 476-483 AD, is the first hagiographical Georgian work and Also the oldest surviving piece of Georgian literature. Hagiography became increasingly popular during and after the period of Persian and Arab dominations over the caucasus. The Georgian Golden Age in 12th and 13th centuries saw the popularity of Hagiography decline on the background of rising secular literature and again during the Mongol and Timurid invasions, which saw the devastation of the Georgian church intitution. It regained its popularity again in the 17th and 18th centuries AD as a respone of forced islamisation under Safavid and Ottoman hegemonies. Notable Georgian hagiographical works include the Passion of St. Eustace , The Martyrdom of the Nine Children of Kola , Passion of Saint Habo , Life of Saint Nino , Life of Gregory of Khandzta, Passion of Gobron, Life of George the Athonite, Passion of Ketevan and others.

==== Byzantines empire ====
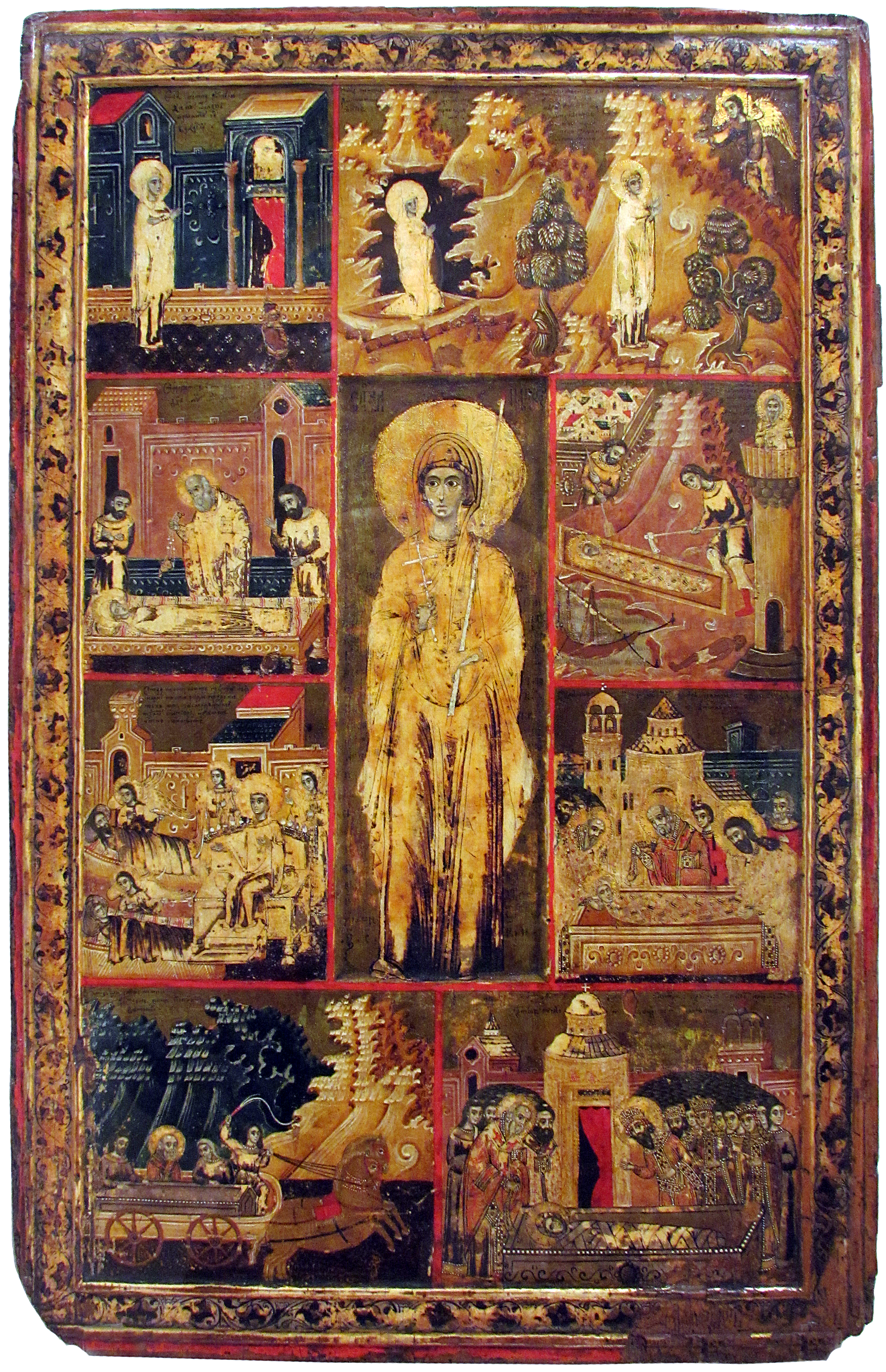
Visual hagiography of St Paraskeva (Patriarchate of Peć, 1719–20)

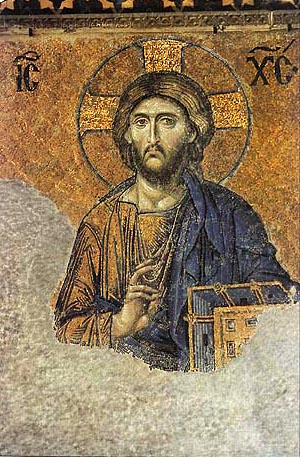
Example of Greek Orthodox visual hagiography. This is one of the best known surviving Byzantine mosaics in Hagia Sophia – Christ Pantocrator flanked by the Virgin Mary and John the Baptist made in the 12th century.

In the 10th century, a Byzantine monk Simeon Metaphrastes was the first one to change the genre of lives of the saints into something different, giving it a moralizing and panegyrical character. His catalog of lives of the saints became the standard for all of the Western and Eastern hagiographers, who would create relative biographies and images of the ideal saints by gradually departing from the real facts of their lives. Over the years, the genre of lives of the saints had absorbed a number of narrative plots and poetic images (often, of pre-Christian origin, such as dragon fighting etc.), mediaeval parables, short stories and anecdotes.

==== Bulgaria ====
The genre of lives of the saints was introduced in the Slavic world in the Bulgarian Empire in the late 9th and early 10th century, where the first original hagiographies were produced on Cyril and Methodius, Clement of Ohrid and Naum of Preslav. Eventually the Bulgarians brought this genre to Kievan Rus' together with writing and also in translations from the Greek language. In the 11th century, they began to compile the original life stories of their first saints, e.g. Boris and Gleb, Theodosius Pechersky etc. In the 16th century, Metropolitan Macarius expanded the list of the Russian saints and supervised the compiling process of their life stories. They would all be compiled in the so-called Velikiye chet'yi-minei catalog (Великие Четьи-Минеи, or Great Menaion Reader), consisting of 12 volumes in accordance with each month of the year. They were revised and expanded by St. Dimitry of Rostov in 1684–1705.

The Life of Alexander Nevsky was a particularly notable hagiographic work of the era.

Today, the works in the genre of lives of the saints represent a valuable historical source and reflection of different social ideas, world outlook and aesthetic concepts of the past.

=== Oriental Orthodoxy ===
The Oriental Orthodox Churches also have their own hagiographic traditions. For instance, Ethiopian Orthodox Tewahedo Church hagiographies in the Ge'ez language are known as gadl (Saint's Life). There are some 200 hagiographies about indigenous saints. They are among the most important Medieval Ethiopian written sources, and some have accurate historical information. They are written by the disciples of the saints. Some were written a long time after the death of a saint, but others were written not long after the saint's demise. Fragments from an Old Nubian hagiography of Saint Michael are extant.

== Judaism ==
Jewish hagiographic writings are largely a medieval and later phenomenon, attributing miracles to rabbis and figures sometimes from much earlier eras, such as those of the Talmud or the Bible. They became increasingly popular in Kabbalistic writings and later in the Hasidic movement.

== Islam ==
Hagiography in Islam began in the Arabic language with biographical writing about the Prophet Muhammad in the 8th century CE, a tradition known as sīra. From about the 10th century CE, a genre generally known as manāqib also emerged, which comprised biographies of the imams (madhāhib) who founded different schools of Islamic thought (madhhab) about shariʿa, and of Ṣūfī saints. Over time, hagiography about Ṣūfīs and their miracles came to predominate in the genre of manāqib.

Likewise influenced by early Islamic research into hadiths and other biographical information about the Prophet, Persian scholars began writing Persian hagiography, again mainly of Sūfī saints, in the eleventh century CE.

The Islamicisation of the Turkish regions led to the development of Turkish biographies of saints, beginning in the 13th century CE and gaining pace around the 16th. Production remained dynamic and kept pace with scholarly developments in historical biographical writing until 1925, when Mustafa Kemal Atatürk (d. 1938) placed an interdiction on Ṣūfī brotherhoods. As Turkey relaxed legal restrictions on Islamic practice in the 1950s and the 1980s, Ṣūfīs returned to publishing hagiography, a trend which continues in the 21st century.

== Other groups ==
The pseudobiography of L. Ron Hubbard compiled by the Church of Scientology is commonly described as a heavily fictionalized hagiography.

== See also ==
- Jean Bolland
- Boniface Consiliarius
- Alban Butler
- Danilo's student
- Hippolyte Delehaye
- Namtar (biography)
- Pseudepigrapha
- Reginald of Durham
- Secular saint
