= André de Soveral =

Brazilian Roman Catholic saint

Saint André de Soveral SJ

Martyr
- Born: c. 1572; Captaincy of São Vicente, Governorate General of Rio de Janeiro, Portuguese Empire
- Died: 16 July 1645 (aged 72–73); Cunhaú, present Canguaretama, Portuguese Empire
- Venerated in: Catholic Church
- Beatified: 5 March 2000 by Pope John Paul II
- Canonized: 15 October 2017 by Pope Francis
- Feast: 16 July
- Patronage: Rio Grande do Norte

André de Soveral SJ (c. 1572 – 16 July 1645) was a Portuguese Catholic priest from Colonial Brazil. He was killed during the Restoration War at the Martyrdom of Cunhau, a massacre promoted by Dutch troops and their Calvinist ministers, who fought against the Portuguese Empire in Brazil. Soveral was a member of the Jesuits.

Soveral was canonized in 2017 by Pope Francis along with 29 fellow martyrs.

== Biography ==
André de Soveral was born in Captaincy of São Vicente, present São Vicente.

On 6 August 1593 he joined the Society of Jesus (SJ). After completing his studies at the Jesuit college of the Infant Jesus, he entered the novitiate of the Society at the College of Bahia at the age of 21. In 1606 Soveral was sent among the Indians in the Rio Grande do Norte region, but only a year later he left the Society of Jesus to become a diocesan pastor in Cunha.

In 1614 he was already a parish priest in Cunhaú (near Natal in the state of Rio Grande do Norte), as a diocesan priest. Cunhaú was a village of Canguaretama, in Rio Grande do Norte, which was formed around a sugar cane mill, one of the riches of the region, in addition to the mines for the production of parts, since those on the other side of the ocean took too long and were expensive, with the threat of low profitability and loss of input in time to be processed by the transformation center (a kind of expansion of Paraiba and Pernambuco production to the north, which is the economic cradle of Potiguar).

== Martyrdom ==
On the morning of 16 July 1645, while celebrating Mass at the Parish of Our Lady of the Candles or Purification, the German Jacó Rabe broke into the church, with the excuse of communicating some provisions by the Supreme Dutch Council of Recife. But after the consecration the Dutch soldiers, accompanied by the Indians of the tribes of the Tapuias and of the Patiguari, rushed into the church and massacred all the faithful, with the same Father André de Soveral, who died praying the prayers of the dying. Their corpses were then looted and only five Portuguese faithful were taken hostage and taken to the Dutch Fort of the Magi. Of the 69 martyrs, only the name of the layman Domingos Carvalho is known.

== Canonization ==
André de Soveral and Domingos Carvalho were beatified by John Paul II on 5 March 2000, together with Father Ambrósio Francisco Ferro, layman Mateus Moreira and their fellow Martyrs of Natal.

On 23 March 2017 Pope Francis signed a decree recognizing the miracle through the intercession of André de Soveral and his companions, and on 20 April 2017 during the consistory he set the date of their canonization.

On 15 October 2017, in St. Peter's Square, Pope Francis held the canonization ceremony of the 30 Protomartyrs of Brazil, whose liturgical feast was celebrated on the 3rd of October.

Liturgical memorial of Soveral and his companions from Cunhaú are celebrated as a moment of death (16 July) and on the day of the death of Ambrósio Francisco Ferro and comrades from Uruaçu (3 October), who is in the state of Rio Grande a day off work.
