= Mateus Moreira =

Brazilian Catholic saint

Saint Mateus Moreira
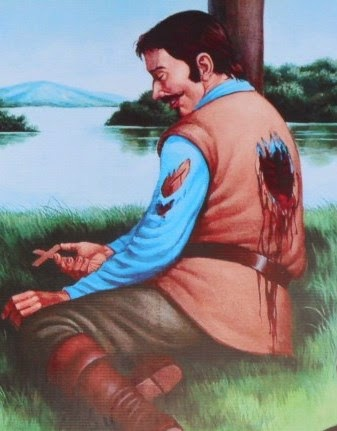

Martyr
- Died: 3 October 1645; Cunhaú, present Canguaretama, Portuguese Empire
- Venerated in: Catholic Church
- Beatified: March 5, 2000 by Pope John Paul II
- Canonized: October 15, 2017 by Pope Francis
- Feast: 3 October
- Patronage: Rio Grande do Norte; Eucharistic Ministers

Mateus Moreira (d. 3 October 1645) was a Portuguese martyr, from Colonial Brazil, of the Catholic Church. He was beatified on March 5, 2000 and canonized on October 15, 2017, along with the other Martyrs of Natal.

== Biography ==
Mateus Moreira was a peasant and lay sacristan who was at Mass on October 3, 1645 when Dutch government troops under the command of Jacob Rabbi executed all the faithful who were at Sunday Mass, presided over by Ambrósio Francisco Ferro who was also martyred. Mateus Moreira had his heart torn out from his back as he exclaimed, "Praise the Blessed Sacrament."

== Beatification ==
The celebration was held in St. Peter's Square in the Vatican in the presence of the bishop of Natal, Mossoró and Caicó, and about a thousand Brazilians.

== Patron of Extraordinary Ministers ==
At the 43rd General Assembly of the CNBB in Itaici/São Paulo in 2005, Mateus Moreira was stated as "Patron of the Extraordinary Ministers of the Eucharistic Communion". In December 2005, the CNBB reported that the Holy See's Congregation for Divine Worship and the Discipline of the Sacraments had approved the Moreira as the patron of ministers.
