= Marta Obregón Rodríguez =

Spanish Servant of God

Servant of God Marta Obregón Rodríguez
- Born: 1 March 1969; A Coruña, Spain
- Died: 22 January 1992 (aged 22); Burgos, Spain

Marta Maria de los Angeles Obregón Rodríguez (1 March 1969 – 22 January 1992) was a young Spanish woman murdered for resisting a rape attempt. She is currently considered a servant of God by the Catholic Church.

== Early life ==
Marta Obregón was born in A Coruña, northern Spain, on March 1, 1969. In December 1970, she moved with her family to Burgos.

After finishing high school, she studied journalism at the Complutense University of Madrid, where she got her Alma mater. In Burgos, she worked in the mornings and spent the afternoons studying at the Arlanza Club (of the congregation Opus Dei). She also participated in the Neocatechumenal Way.

On the night of January 21, 1992, she was kidnapped in front of her house after returning from the Arlanza Club by a man and taken to a remote area of the city. The assailant wanted to have sex with her, but she resisted. He then violently attacked her, but she defended herself and did not let the rape take place. He then stabbed her 14 times in her left side, even piercing her heart.

Young Obregón's body was found five days after the murder. According to the expert report, she died in the early hours of January 22. Numerous abrasions and bruises were found on the victim's body. The report states that the injuries arose as a result of her defending herself against her assailant.

== Beatification process ==
The Archdiocese of Burgos, when it became aware of Obregón's trajectory, began efforts to beatify her in view of the martyrdom she suffered for defending her chastity.

On April 28, 2007, the Congregation for the Causes of Saints announced that the Holy See saw no obstacles to starting the process of her beatification. The diocesan phase of the process was initiated on June 14, 2011, by Archbishop Francisco Gil Hellín. On February 11, 2019, all the documentation gathered about Obregón's martyrdom was received at the Vatican for study.

== Exteranal links ==
- Hagiography Circle
