= Rolando Rivi =

Italian Roman Catholic seminarian (1931–1945)

Blessed Rolando Rivi
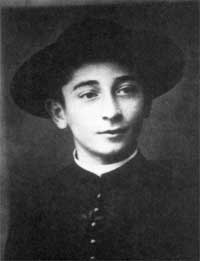

Martyr
- Born: 7 January 1931; San Valentino di Castellarano, Reggio Emilia, Kingdom of Italy
- Died: 13 April 1945 (aged 14); Piane di Monchio, Palagano, Kingdom of Italy
- Venerated in: Roman Catholic Church
- Beatified: 5 October 2013, Palazzo dello Sport Giuseppe Panini, Modena, Italy by Cardinal Angelo Amato
- Feast: 29 May
- Attributes: Cassock; Cappello Romano

Rolando Maria Rivi (7 January 1931 – 13 April 1945) was an Italian Roman Catholic seminarian. Rivi was noted for his studious and pious nature with an intense love for Jesus Christ, which was evident through frequent confession and the reception of the Eucharist. He was amiable to all and wore his cassock with great pride in order to affirm that he belonged to Christ and his church. Accusing him of having spied for the Italian Social Republic, Communist partisans murdered him in odium fidei (in hatred of the faith) towards the end of World War II in Modena because he was learning to become a priest.

Rivi's holiness was well-noted in his lifetime and people began to hail him as a saint after his vicious murder after which people called for him to be beatified. The cause for his sainthood did not open until 30 September 2005 when he was accorded the title "Servant of God" and subsequently Pope Francis oversaw his beatification later on 5 October 2013.

== Life ==
=== Childhood and education ===
Rolando Maria Rivi was born on 7 January 1931 in the rural San Valentino as the second of three sons to Roberto Rivi (30 October 1903 – 22 October 1992) and his wife Albertina Canovi; he was baptised on January 8 by the parish priest, Luigi Lemmi. His father consecrated the child on the day of his baptism to Our Lady of Mount Carmel.

His birthplace was located in the foothills of the Apennines between the Secchia and Tresinaro rivers. His paternal grandparents were Alfonso and Anna Ferrari Rivi, who had moved to Levizzano-Baiso to work the land there and since the 1920s lived in a large house named "Poggiolo" with their nine children, of whom Roberto was the eldest son.

Rolando grew up educated in the Catholic faith due to the influence of his mother and in the strong religious atmosphere of his parish. Before going to work in the fields each morning, like his father, he attended Mass. In this atmosphere of strong religious faith he grew. He had a passion for music, and learned to play the harmonium. His exuberance and liveliness often proved a test to his parents, but his grandmother, Anna, sensed his good character. She once said, "Rolando will become either a rascal or a saint! He can not walk the middle ground".

In 1937, he began attending the local school. He was admitted to receive his First Communion almost at once because he was among the better prepared children and eager to do so. This took place on 16 June 1938, on the Feast of Corpus Christi. Rolando changed after that event: while remaining amiable and energetic he became more mature and responsible, a change which was accentuated after receiving his Confirmation on 24 June 1940 from the Bishop of Reggio Emilia Eduardo Brettoni.

=== Seminarian ===
In the meantime, his parish priest, Olinto Marzocchini became his teacher and a spiritual father. Rivi availed himself of the Sacrament of Penance each week and each morning he got up to serve Mass and receive the Eucharist. When he was 11 years old, he informed his family that he wanted to join the priesthood. His parents did not oppose the decision, and after he completed his schooling he commenced his ecclesial studies in Marola in Carpineti on 1 October 1942. As was the custom, he wore the cassock from the moment he entered as a seminarian and was proud of the garment, viewing it as a sign of his belonging to Christ and to the church. His spiritual mentor at this time was Alfredo Castagnetti.

In June 1944 after Nazi German forces occupied Italy, the superiors of the seminary closed the establishment and Rolando returned home but persisted in wearing his cassock with pride. This was against the wishes of his parents, who were worried about rising anti-religious sentiment in the area and incidents of violence against those associated with the Church. However, Rolando would not give in and continued to wear it, even during vacations and during the hot summer months. He told his parents: "I am studying to be a priest and these clothes are the sign that I belong to Jesus".

=== Abduction and murder ===
On the morning of 10 April 1945, at the tail end of the war, Rolando served Mass and then returned home to collect some books before going to the woods, as he liked to do. A group of Communist partisans abducted him. At midday his worried parents noticed he had not returned for lunch, so they went to the woods to find him. There they came across his books scattered around and on them a note for his parents which said, "Do not search for him. He is coming with us for a little while".

The partisans accused Rolando of collaborating with the Fascists to defeat them and they beat and insulted him, stripping him of the cassock, which upset him greatly. He was taken to a farm some 25 kilometers away that served as the partisans' hideout and was locked up in the pigpen. The men struck him on the legs with his own belt as they inveighed against the priesthood and the Church. Some of the partisans wanted to let the boy go, saying he was just a child, but the verdict was that he was to die. Those who wavered were told, "Shut up or you will meet the same fate".

On 12 April, the commander of the Garibaldi Brigade, a group of partisans, said: "Tomorrow one priest less". The group murdered him on 13 April. Rolando was taken to a shallow grave that had been dug and was made to kneel on the edge. He asked the partisans, "Allow me the time to say a prayer for my father and mother". While he was weeping at his prayers, two of the partisans each fired a shot with their pistols. He was killed instantly by one bullet to the heart and another to the left temple. It was just after 3:00pm. The men buried him and rolled his cassock into a ball, which they kicked about before abandoning it at the door of a random house. On the evening of 14 April, Rolando's father and the priest Alberto Camellini, curate of San Valentino, found Rolando's corpse in the grave and saw it was covered in bruises with the two fatal wounds evident. On 15 April the two of them took his remains to wash and compose it for the funeral. He was buried in the San Valentino graveyard on 29 May 1945. The body was later reburied inside the church on 26 June 1997.

The trial of Rolando’s killers brought to light the motives for his execution.

"Because of his pious and irreproachable conduct, because of his zeal for practicing the faith, the seminarian Rolando Rivi … was for the local youth an edifying example of civic and Christian virtues… His capture and suppression thus had as their motive and effect the permanent elimination of an effective obstacle to the penetration of Communist doctrine among the youth… The murderers’ pretext that Rolando was a spy had been invented for the needs of the cause."

In 1951, the Assize Court of Lucca found the 16-year-old Giuseppe Corghi (who had fired the first shot) and 26-year-old Delciso Rioli (the partisan commander) guilty of Rolando's murder, sentencing them both to 23 years imprisonment. The sentence was confirmed by the Appeals Court of Florence and subsequently by the supreme court in 1952, the final sentence imposed being of 22 years.

=== Legacy ===
Rivi became noted in his town and the surrounding areas for his holiness and for his deep and unwavering faith to Jesus Christ. He was best remembered for his love of the cassock which he believed made him one who belonged to Christ and his church. His figure became more well known in 2001 after it was reported that the English child James Blacknall (b. 1998) was cured of leukemia on 4 April 2001 after a hair and blood relic of Rivi was placed under his pillow with a novena said.

The L'Osservatore Romano published two articles on Rivi twice on 12 April 2000 and on 16 January 2004.

== Beatification ==
The beatification process opened under Pope Benedict XVI on 30 September 2005 and titled Rivi as a Servant of God. The diocesan phase concluded a short while later on 24 June 2006. All documentation was transmitted to the competent authorities in Rome, which reviewed them and confirmed the earlier proceedings. The postulation compiled and sent the Positio dossier to the Congregation in 2010. Theological approval of the dossier was granted on 18 May 2012 and that of the C.C.S. on 8 January 2013.

Pope Francis declared on 27 March 2013 that Rolando Rivi was killed "in odium fidei" (in hatred of the faith) and thus gave permission for the beatification to take place. Rolando was beatified in Modena on 5 October 2013 at a solemn Mass presided over by Cardinal Angelo Amato on the pope's behalf, in the presence of almost 20,000 people. The beatification confers the title "Blessed", so that the Catholic Church now regards the martyr as "Blessed Rolando Rivi".

The cause for the final step of canonization, by which the person is declared a saint, continues. The current postulator for the cause is Francesca Consolini.
