= Martyrs of Natal =

17th-century Catholic martyrs

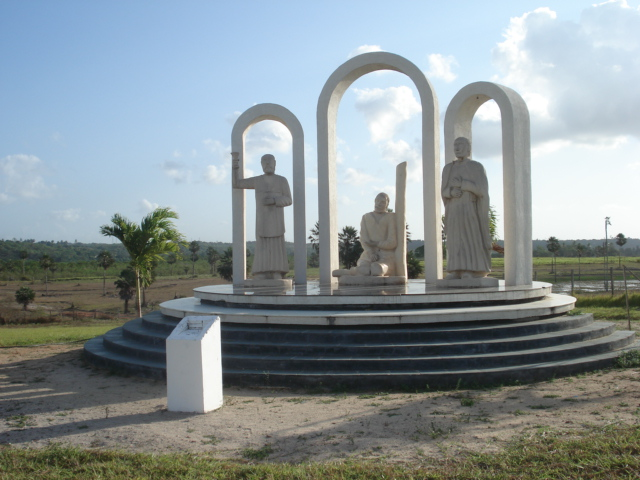
- Monument to the martyrs in São Gonçalo do Amarante, Brazil
- Died: 16 July 1645; 3 October 1645, Cunhaú, Rio Grande do Norte, Brazil; Uruaçu, Rio Grande do Norte, Brazil
- Venerated in: Catholic Church
- Beatified: 5 March 2000, Saint Peter's Square, Vatican City, by Pope John Paul II
- Canonized: 15 October 2017, Saint Peter's Square, Vatican City, by Pope Francis
- Feast: 3 October
- Attributes: Palm branch
- Patronage: Rio Grande do Norte
- Notable martyrs: André de Soveral; Ambrósio Francisco Ferro; Mateus Moreira

The Martyrs of Natal were a group of 30 Catholic people of Colonial Brazil – two of them priests – killed in the northern part of the territory in massacres led by a group of Dutch Calvinists. One priest was a Colonial Brazilian Jesuit missionary, while the other priest was an evangelizer. The others were all lay Catholics, most of them anonymous members of the Church, some of them children.

The 30 individuals were beatified in Saint Peter's Square on 5 March 2000. Pope Francis – on 23 March 2017 – signed a decree that approved their canonization while waiving the miracle required for sainthood; the date was formalized at a gathering of cardinals on 20 April and the group was canonized as saints on 15 October 2017.

== Lives and murders ==
=== Background ===
The Natal region was colonized after the Portuguese Catholics arrived but the Dutch Calvinists soon took over and spread their anti-Catholic sentiment across the region, while making persecution of all remaining Catholics an objective for them.

Despite the air of persecution some priests moved to the area in order to sustain the people in their faith.

=== André de Soveral ===
André de Soveral was born in Brazil in 1572. He was a professed member of the Society of Jesus, having entered the Jesuits in 1593 and making his period of novitiate in Bahia. He studied Latin – as well as the native language – and theological studies before being sent to the college in Olinda. His first experience in the missions was in Rio Grande do Norte in 1606 amongst the natives, for catechism lessons. In 1614 he was a parish priest in Cunhaú.

On 16 July 1645 – a Sunday – there were 69 people gathered in the chapel of Our Lady of the Candles for a Mass that Soveral presided over. It was just before the Eucharistic rite that Dutch soldiers attacked the chapel and murdered Soveral and a companion – Domingos Carvalho – along with others.

=== October massacre ===
On 3 October 1645 a total of 200 armed natives with their Dutch allies targeted and hacked to death 30 individuals including children and one priest. The leader of this group was the radical Calvinist Antonio Paraopaba. Mateus Moreira – a victim of the onslaught – cried out as he died: "Praise be the Blessed Sacrament".

=== Individuals ===
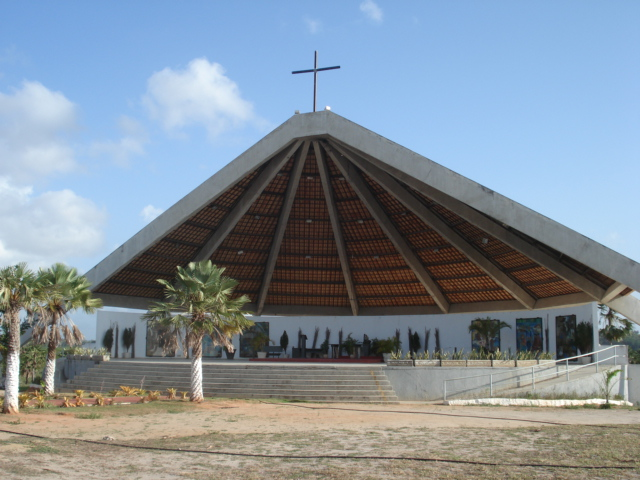
Chapel dedicated to the martyrs in São Gonçalo do Amarante

The 2 individuals killed on 16 July 1645 are:

- André de Soveral (b. 1572) – Jesuit priest
- Domingos Carvalho – layman

The 28 individuals killed on 3 October 1645 are:

- Ambrósio Francisco Ferro – priest
- Antônio Vilela – married layman
- A daughter of Vilela – young laywoman
- José do Porto – layman
- Francisco de Bastos – layman
- Diogo Pereira – layman
- João Lostau Navarro – layman
- Antônio Vilela Cid – layman
- Estêvão Machado de Miranda – married layman
- A daughter of de Miranda – young laywoman
- A daughter of de Miranda – young laywoman
- Vicente de Souza Pereira – layman
- Francisco Mendes Pereira – layman
- João da Silveira – layman
- Simão Correia – layman
- Antônio Baracho – layman
- Mateus Moreira – layman
- João Martins – layman
- 7 lay companions of Martins
- Manuel Rodrigues de Moura – married layman
- The wife of Moura – married laywoman
- A daughter of Francisco Dias – laywoman

== Canonization ==
The beatification process opened in Natal on 6 June 1989 after the Congregation for the Causes of Saints issued the official "nihil obstat" and titled them all as Servants of God. The diocesan process spanned from 1989 until 1994 and the C.C.S. later validated this process on 25 November 1994 before receiving the Positio in 1998.

The theologians approved the cause on 23 June 1998 as did the C.C.S. on 10 November 1998. Pope John Paul II confirmed that the group were all killed "in odium fidei" (in hated of the faith) and thus approved their beatifications. He presided over the beatification celebration in Saint Peter's Square on 5 March 2000.

Pope Francis had expressed in the past his closeness to this particular cause and expressed willingness to canonize them as saints. The C.C.S. met on 14 March 2017 to discuss the omission of the miracle needed for canonization and voiced their approval of that. The pope approved the canonization on 23 March 2017 in an official decree with the date formalized at a gathering of cardinals on 20 April; the group was canonized in Saint Peter's Square on 15 October 2017.

The postulator for this cause at the time of the canonization was Giovangiuseppe Califano.
