= The Martyrs of Mbokotwana =

The Martyrs of Mboktwana were seven Christian men massacred in 1880.

== The massacre ==
The story of the massacre is described by Mr R. Stewart, of the Kaffrarian Mission as follows:

Afterwards we learned that within half an hour of our departure from St. Paul's the (impi) army of the Pondomise arrived there, and burned the teacher's house and church; so that the thunderstorm, despite the wetting it gave us, was a great mercy, in that it probably delayed their arrival until after our departure. We desired to send a body of men from this place to another out-station, Umbogolwana (Mboktwana), to bring out the teachers and native Christians there. But owing to the smallness of our force this was deemed, by the leaders of the expedi tion, impossible. These poor people at Umbogotwana (Mboktwana), I have learned since, were surrounded the following night, and seven of the men killed, amongst whom were Klass Lutseke, the native catechist, Joshua Mabengwana, the schoolmaster, and Daniel Sokombela, the schoolmaster of Umjika; the women and children were allowed to escape, however, and many of them, including the families of Klass, Joshua, and Daniel, have, after great privations, reached us here at Umtata in safety.

Callaway describes how Bransby Key, bishop of St John's understood that the massacre was an attack on Christians rather than on a racial or tribal group (the Fingoes).

== Commemoration ==
The Anglican Church of Southern Africa commemorates The Martyrs of Mboktwana in its Calendar of saints on the 3rd day of November each year. In addition the collect for this commemoration is as follows:

Father of Jesus your servants, the Martyrs of Mbokotwana,
gave up their lives rather than betray their faith in your Son:
give us grace to follow their example by renouncing self,
taking up our cross and following you;
through Jesus Christ our Lord, Amen

== Notes and references ==
- Montgomery, Henry Hutchinson (1923). The History of the S.P.G. House.
- Callaway, Godfrey (1912). A Shepherd of the Veld: Bransby Lewis Key, Bishop of St. John's, Kaffraria. Wells Gardner Darton.
- Mr R. Stewart, of the Kaffrarian Mission (1881). "The Outbreak of the Pondomise". Mission Field: A Monthly Record of the Proceedings of the Society for the Propagation of the Gospel in Foreign Parts. London: Bell and Sons: 116–7.
