= Ambrósio Francisco Ferro =

Brazilian Roman Catholic saint

Saint Ambrósio Francisco Ferro

Martyr
- Born: Azores, Kingdom of Portugal
- Died: 3 October 1645; Cunhaú, present Canguaretama, Portuguese Empire
- Venerated in: Catholic Church
- Beatified: March 5, 2000 by Pope John Paul II
- Canonized: October 15, 2017 by Pope Francis
- Feast: 3 October
- Patronage: Rio Grande do Norte

Ambrósio Francisco Ferro (d. 3 October 1645) was a Portuguese priest from the Azores and martyr of the Catholic Church.

== Biography ==
Francisco Ferro, a native of Azores, came to Brazil with relatives. He was ordained priest and from 1636 he was a parish priest in Natal. On October 3, 1645, Ambrosio Francisco Ferro, was martyred at the hands of the Dutch military unit, along with 28 faithful, among whom were his relatives, on the Uruaçu River.

His beatification was performed by Pope John Paul II on March 5, 2000, along with the beatification of André de Soveral and his companions.

On March 23, 2017, Pope Francis signed a decree recognizing the miracle through the intercession of Blessed Ambrósio Francisco Ferro, and on April 20, 2017 during the consistory, he set the date of his canonization.

The writing of his name as saints along with 34 new saints took place on October 15, 2017 at St. Peter's Square by Pope Francis.
