= The Martyrdom of the Nine Children of Kola =

The Martyrdom of the Nine Children of Kola (Georgian: კოლაელ ყრმათა მარტვილობა, romanized: k'olael q'rmata mart'viloba) is an anonymous work of Georgian literature. This hagiographical text describes the martyrdom of nine young Christian converts (aged around 9) who were executed by their pagan parents.

The text provides historical insights into the early spread of Christianity in the region of Tao. According to the text, both Christians and pagans coexisted in a valley called Kola (located near the source of the Kura River, now in Turkey). Despite the numerical and legal dominance of the pagans, which included the village chief, Christians were permitted to conduct services in their church without restriction. However, proselytising or preaching Christianity to the pagan population was strictly forbidden.

The narrative also highlights the absolute authority of parents during this era, noting that a parent held the power of life and death over a disobedient child. According to the Martyrdom, the children's pagan parents initially tortured them for refusing to renounce their Christian faith. Ultimately, with the assistance of other villagers, they crushed the children's heads and stoned them to death.

== Plot ==
The story is set near the source of the Kura River in a valley known as Kola, where a small community of Christians coexists with a dominant pagan majority. Even the village chief is a pagan. Despite their religious differences, nine pagan children, aged seven to nine, regularly play with the local Christian children. Over time, the pagan children adopt the customs of their Christian peers. Whenever the church bells ring and the Christian children head to services, the pagan children follow them. However, they are barred from entering the church and are told they must first be baptised.

Desiring to join their friends, the nine children secretly seek out a Christian priest. Fearing retribution from the pagan community, the priest refuses to perform the ritual during the day; instead, he baptises the children at night in the freezing waters of the Kura River without their parents' knowledge or permission.

When the pagan parents discover the baptism, they bring the matter before the village chief. The chief declines to intervene, stating that the children belong to the parents to discipline as they see fit. The parents then drag their children back to the exact location on the riverbank where they were baptised. There, they dig a pit, cast the children inside, and stone them to death, crushing their heads for refusing to renounce their new faith.

== Title ==
The title of the Martyrdom in the codex is given in Ivir. georg. 8 (fol. 173r). The Martyrdom is ascribed for the commemoration on 22 February: 'თ(ოჳეს)ა ფებ{ე}რვალსა : კ˜ბ :'

Athos, Iviron Monastery, Georgian MS 8, fol. 173r	Translation
წამებაჲ : ყრმათა : წ(მიდა)თაჲ : რიცხჳთ : ცხრათაჲ : რ(ომელ)ნი : იყვნეს : სოჳლითა : ძმანი : ნათლის : ღებითა : წ(მი)დისა : გან : ემბაზისა : ხ(ოლო) შობილ : იყვნეს : თავის : თავსა : დედისა : გან : თჳსისა : : ლ˜ა	The Martyrdom of the Holy Children, Nine in Number, who were Brothers in Spirit through Baptism from the Holy Font, though each was Born each by a different Mother

== Manuscript tradition and publications ==
The text has survived in a single 10th-century manuscript, under the current shelf mark Georgian MS 8, which was discovered by Nicholai Marr at Mount Athos, Monasery of Iviron in 1897. This is the only manuscript which preserved the text of the Martyrdom.

The text has been published several times:

- 1903: First publication by Nicholas Marr, including a Russian translation.
- 1914: Published by David Karichashvili.
- 1944: Published by Ilia Abuladze, pp. 184–186.
- 1963: Abuladze et al., pp. 183–185.
- 2024: Published by Khatuna Gaprindashvili, as the part of the entire codex of Ivir. georg. 8.
