= Karolina Kózka =

Polish martyr (1898–1914)

Blessed Karolina Kózka
- Painting of Karolina Kózka, circa 2008

Virgin and martyr
- Born: 2 August 1898; Wał-Ruda, Małopolskie, Austria-Hungary
- Died: 18 November 1914 (aged 16); Wał-Ruda, Małopolskie, Austria-Hungary
- Venerated in: Roman Catholic Church
- Beatified: 10 June 1987, Tarnów, Poland by Pope John Paul II
- Major shrine: Shrine of Blessed Karolina Kózka, Tarnów, Poland
- Feast: 18 November

Karolina Kózka (2 August 1898 – 18 November 1914) was a sixteen-year old Polish victim of a sex attack and murder. Prior to that she was known locally for her strong faith and her eagerness to catechize her neighbours and children. Kózka is often referred to as the "Polish Maria Goretti" due to the manner of her death.

Kózka's death caused great public outrage against Russians since a Russian soldier was believed to have attacked and killed her. Three thousand people flocked to her funeral and called for her canonization cause to be introduced as she died defending her virginity. The cause formally commenced in the 1950s and culminated in 1987 with Pope John Paul II beatifying her in independent Poland.

== Life ==
Karolina Kózka was born on 2 August 1898 in a hamlet near the village of Zabawa, Lesser Poland, at that time part of Austria-Hungary. She was the fourth of eleven children born to peasant farmers, Jan Kózka and Maria Borzęcka. She was baptized on 7 August at the local parish church of Saint John the Baptist. Her childhood was spent on the family farm. From 1906 until 1912 she attended the local primary school and had further part-time schooling from 1912 to 1913. She would often gather neighbours and relatives and invite them to read the Bible together under a pear tree near her home. Kózka loved reciting the rosary using beads her mother had given her. She would fall asleep praying to Mary. Kózka would pray on her long walk to Mass. Her uncle Franciszek Borzęcki was an inspiration to her and she would help him in his role of librarian. She also helped out teaching the catechism to children of the parish. During Lent she would lead her family in singing about the Passion of the Lord and at Christmas would intone carols. Some of the villagers referred to her home as "the little church".

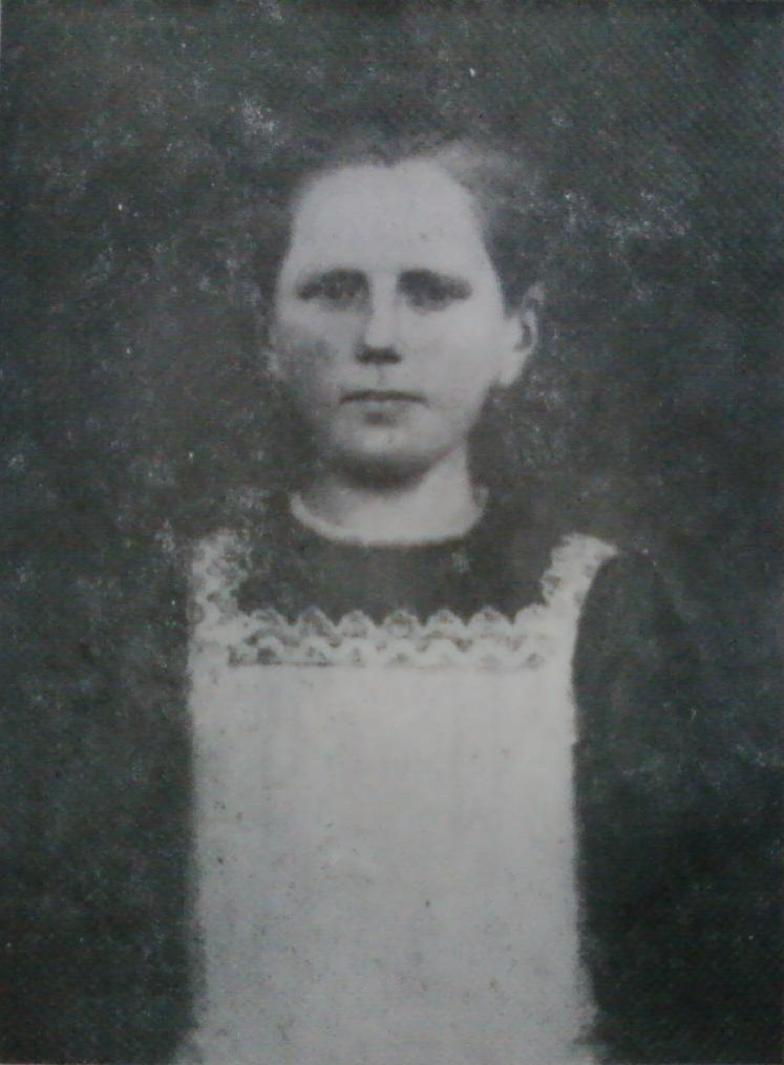
The only photo of Karolina

Kózka received her First Communion in 1907. She was confirmed on 18 May 1914. She is said to have had a particular devotion to the Mother of God evidenced by her custom to recite the rosary deep into the night. In 1914 with the outbreak of World War I Russian forces began occupying Polish towns and cities under Austrian rule and in mid-November entered Wał-Ruda. Tensions grew as stories swirled about soldiers looting and raping women which exacerbated fear in the area. At the start of the occupation a Russian soldier come to the Kózka farm but he left after he was offered a meal.

== Abduction and murder ==
On 18 November 1914 at around 9:00 in the morning an armed Russian soldier came to the house asking questions about Austrian forces before ordering Kózka and Karolina to accompany him to the commanding officer. When the pair and the soldier reached the edge of the forest the soldier ordered the father to return home. Kózka agreed and abandoned his 16-year-old daughter to the rapist. Two nearby Polish men, Franciszek Zaleśny and Franciszek Broda, hid in the bushes watching the soldier assault Karolina. From their account, the soldier attempted to force himself upon her but she struggled and thwarted his attempted rape. Enraged, the soldier then stabbed her with his bayonet multiple times. She managed to escape and ran some 800 meters towards nearby swamps which saved her from further attacks. The soldier saw her fall and gave up the chase believing her to be dead. Since he had slit Karolina's carotid artery, she soon bled to death in the swamps, some time before 9:40. Her body was not found until 4 December 1914. Karolina was buried on December 6, with around 3000 people attending her funeral.

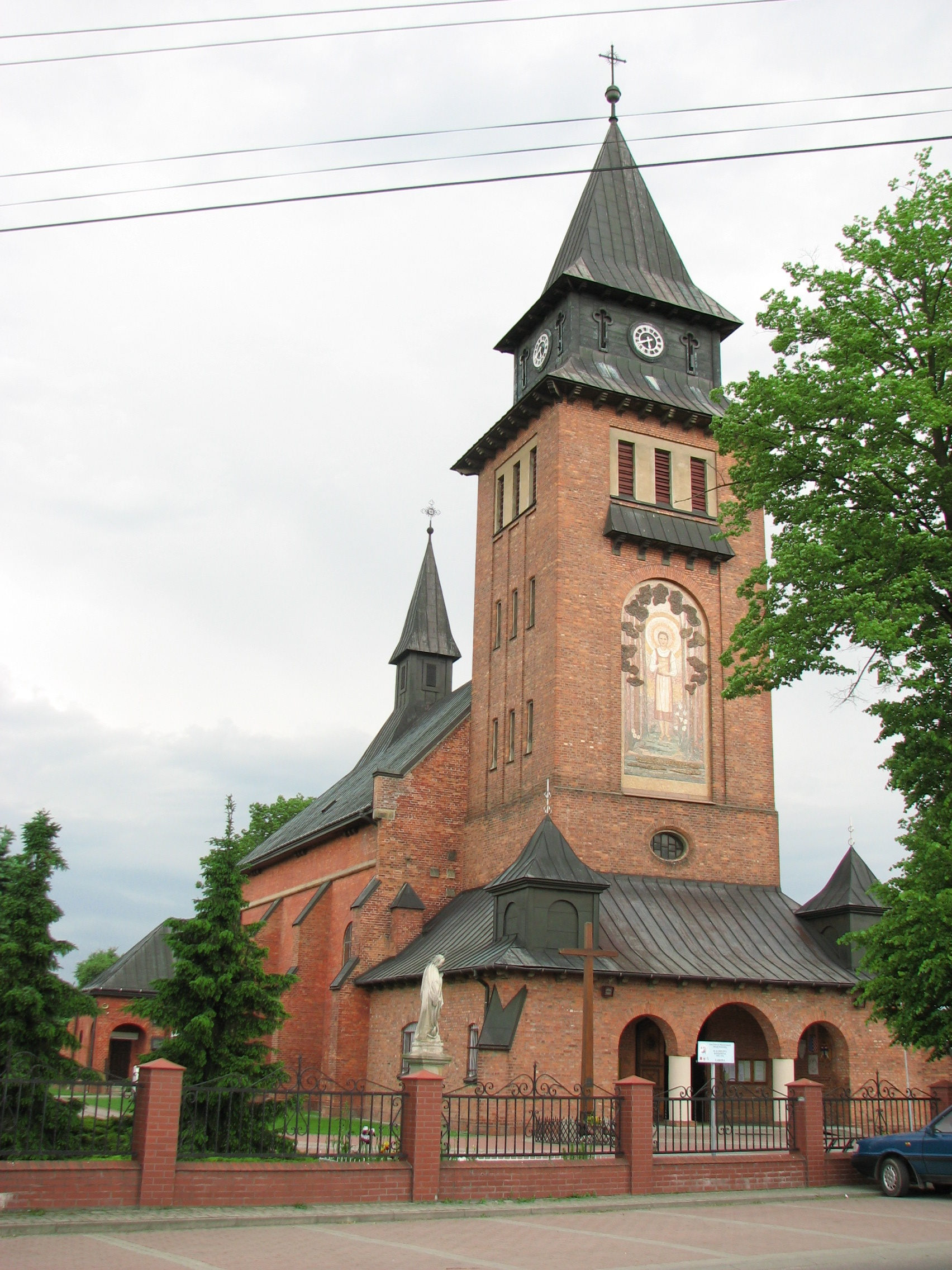
Holy Trinity Church, Zabawa, resting place of Karolina Kózka

According to Rozalia Łazarz, a nurse present at her autopsy, Karolina died a virgin. Her remains were relocated on 18 March 1987 beneath the main altar of the Zabawa parish church, at the behest of the Bishop of Tarnów. The site where she died is marked with a cross. On 18 June 1916 a monument was erected in her honour by the Zabawa church.

== Beatification ==
The beatification process opened in Tarnów diocese with an informative process on 11 February 1965. On 30 June 1986 her beatification received papal approval after Pope John Paul II confirmed that Kózka was killed "in defensum castitatis" – in defence of chastity – and beatified her in Tarnów while visiting Poland on 10 June 1987.
