= Biskovychi =

Rural locality in Lviv Oblast, Ukraine

Biskovychi Бісковичі
- Village
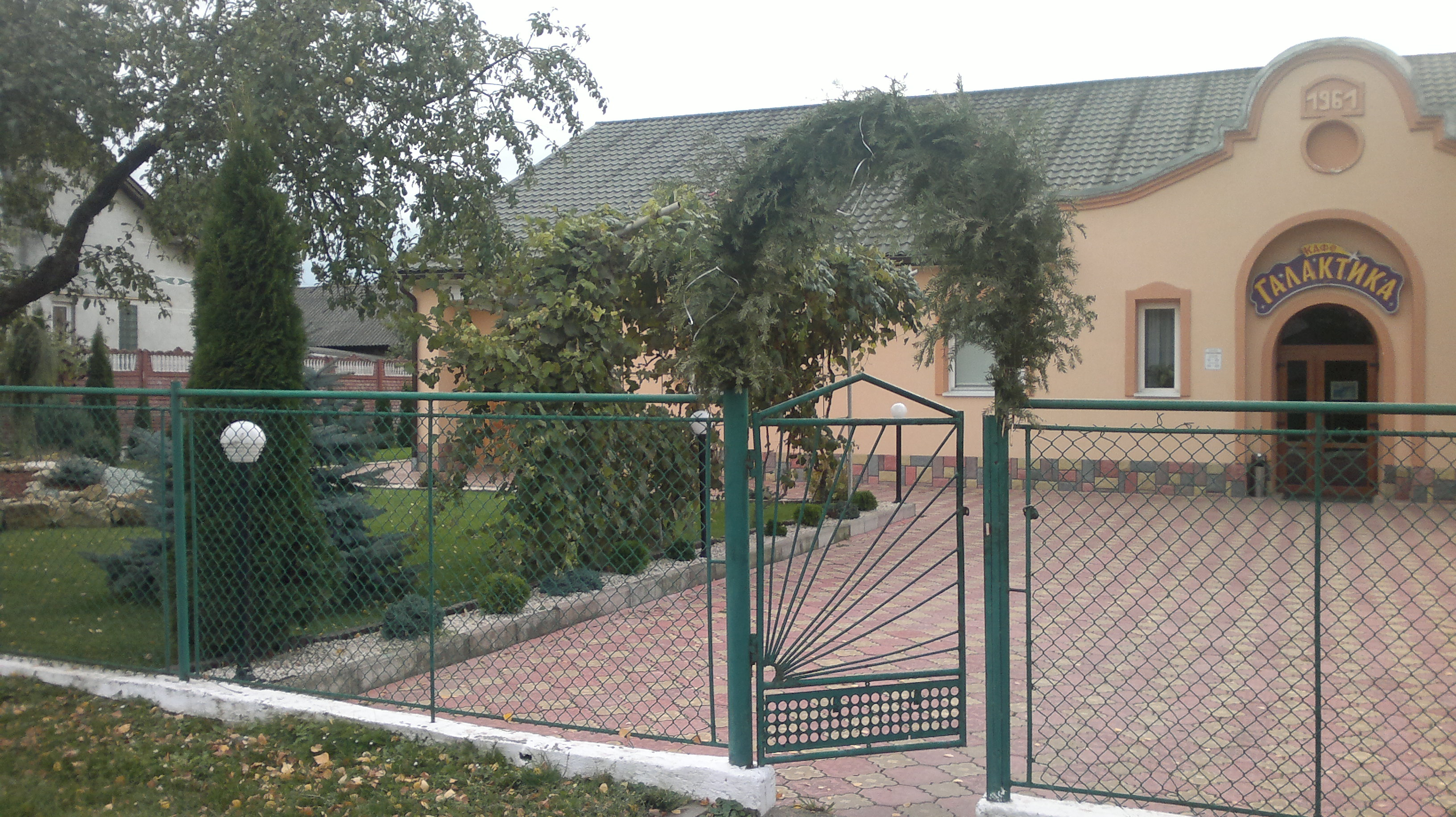

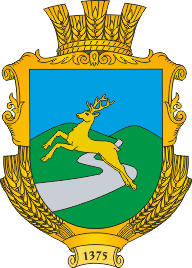
- Coat of arms

- Location within Ukraine
- Coordinates: 49°32′20″N 23°09′21″E
- Country: Ukraine
- Oblast: Lviv
- Raion: Sambir
- Area: 11.54 km^{2} (4.46 sq mi)
- Population: 2,413
  - Density: 209.1/km^{2} (541.6/sq mi)

Biskovychi (Ukrainian: Бісковичі, Polish: Biskowice) is a village in Sambir Raion, Lviv Oblast, in south-west Ukraine. Biskovychi hosts the administration of Biskovychi rural hromada, one of the hromadas of Ukraine.

== History ==
First mentioned in 1373. Historically, noble property belonging to the Lubomirski family, located in 1589 within Przemyśl Land of the Ruthenian Voivodeship. Under the Second Polish Republic, it served as the seat of the Biskowice Municipality of the Sambor District—being home to over 3,000 inhabitants, predominantly Poles.

Under German Occupation, the Polish Rychlik family hid the Jew Icchak Erdman for several months in 1942 and later provided him with shelter in the village of Zdrochec near Tarnów. In 1985, the Yad Vashem institute decided to posthumously award Antoni Rychlik the title of Righteous Among the Nations.

== Demographics ==
As of 2001, the village had a population of 2,413 inhabitants, with the following distribution of native languages:

Language	Number	Percentage
Ukrainian	2292	94.99%
Polish	116	4.81%
Russian	4	0.16%
German	1	0.04%
Total	2413	100%

== Notable people ==
- Antoni Hanebach (1895-1967) Polish soldier, politician, and public official.
- Jan Maciela (1906-1967) Polish educator and communist politician.
- Wojciech Michalik (1939-?) Polish rugby player and sports official.
- Halyna Yednak-Strakhotska (born 1961) Ukrainian cyclist.
