= Verkhivtsi =

Rural locality in Lviv Oblast, Ukraine

Verkhivtsi Верхівці
- Village
- Location within Lviv Oblast Location within Ukraine
- Coordinates: 49°38′07″N 23°06′02″E
- Country: Ukraine
- Oblast: Lviv
- Raion: Sambir
- Area: 9.465 km^{2} (3.654 sq mi)
- Population: 1,047
  - Density: 110.6/km^{2} (286.5/sq mi)

Verkhivtsi (Ukrainian: Верхівці, Polish: Rajtarowice) is a village (selo) in Sambir Raion, Lviv Oblast, in south-west Ukraine. It belongs to Biskovychi rural hromada, one of the hromadas of Ukraine.

The local Orthodox church was mentioned in 1507.
