= Mykhaylo Pysko =

Ukrainian footballer

Personal information
- Full name: Mykhaylo Mykhaylovych Pysko
- Date of birth: 19 March 1993 (age 33)
- Place of birth: Volia-Baranetska, Lviv Oblast, Ukraine
- Height: 1.75 m (5 ft 9 in)
- Position: Left back

Team information
- Current team: FC Probiy Horodenka

Youth career
- 2006–2011: UFK Lviv

Senior career*
Years	Team	Apps	(Gls)
2011–2017	Shakhtar Donetsk	0	(0)
2014–2015	→ Zorya Luhansk (loan)	4	(0)
2015	→ Hoverla Uzhhorod (loan)	0	(0)
2015–2016	→ Illichivets Mariupol (loan)	24	(0)
2017	→ Gomel (loan)	21	(0)
2018	Rukh Vynnyky	25	(1)
2019	Inhulets Petrove	8	(1)
2020	Belshina Bobruisk	1	(0)
2020	Ahrobiznes Volochysk	3	(0)
2021	Avanhard Kramatorsk	16	(0)
2021–2023	Prykarpattia Ivano-Frankivsk	33	(1)
2024–	Probiy Horodenka	18	(0)

International career
2011–2012	Ukraine U19	10	(1)
2014	Ukraine U21	10	(0)
- * Club domestic league appearances and goals as of 3 July 2024

Mykhaylo Pysko (Ukrainian: Михайло Михайлович Писко; born 19 March 1993) is a Ukrainian football defender who plays for Probiy Horodenka.

== Career ==
Pysko is the son of the Ukrainian football youth coach and former player Mykhaylo Pysko. He is a product of the UFK Lviv youth sportive school and signed a contract with FC Shakhtar Donetsk in the Ukrainian Premier League in 2011.

He played 3 years for the FC Shakhtar Donetsk Reserves and Youth Team in the Ukrainian Premier League Reserves Championship and in July 2014 went on loan to FC Zorya in the Ukrainian Premier League. Pysko made his debut for FC Zorya playing full-time in a match against FC Olimpik Donetsk on 3 August 2014 in the Ukrainian Premier League.
