= Jacek Kędzior =

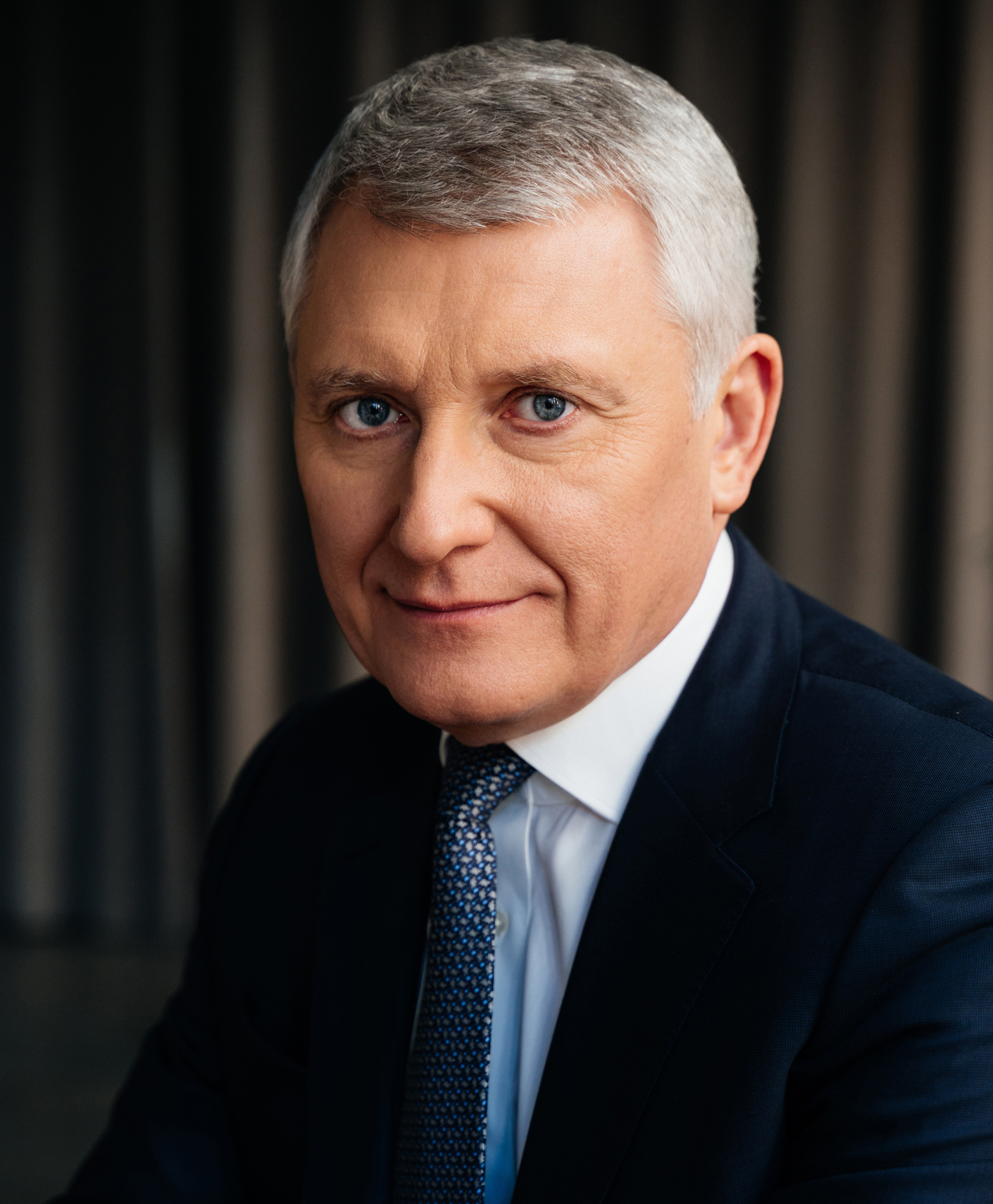
- Born: June 15, 1969 (age 57); Radłów, Poland
- Education: Jagiellonian University
- Occupations: Lawyer; Tax advisor Business executive
- Known for: EY Europe Central Managing Partner, Managing Partner of EY Poland
- Website: www.ey.com/pl_pl/people/jacek-kedzior

Jacek Kędzior (born 15 June 1969) is a Polish lawyer, licensed tax advisor, manager and business leader. He is the EY Europe Central Managing Partner, a role covering 33 countries following EY's 2025 operating-model change. He also served as Country Managing Partner of EY Poland, from January 2014 to June 2026.

== Biography ==
In 1994, Jacek Kędzior graduated from the Jagiellonian University in Kraków with a degree in law, and in 1998, he passed his exams to become a licensed tax advisor.

He is a business leader. He participated in and graduated from several international education programs. Among them are the University of Edinburgh (UK), the Columbus School of Law in Washington, D.C. (US), the University of Antwerp (Belgium) as well as executive program - IESE Business School at the University of Navarra (Spain).

From the start of his professional career in 1994, Jacek Kędzior has been involved with the advisory services industry, first with Arthur Andersen, and since 2002, with Ernst & Young (operating under the name of EY from July 2013).

As a tax advisor, he specialized in tax consulting and represented his clients before the tax authorities and at the Supreme Administrative Court in Poland. He worked with Polish and international companies across many sectors, i.a. pharmaceutical, energy, and real estate. His clients included among others Vattenfall, Orlen, Lotos, Petrolinvest, Górażdże, and HeidelbergCement AG.

In the years 2007–2013 Jacek Kędzior served as Managing Partner for EY Poland’s Tax Advisory practice. In January 2014 he became Country Managing Partner for EY Poland and he held this function till the end of June 2026. From 2014 to 2018 he served as Regional Managing Partner for Central and Southeastern Europe (CSE).

Following an enlargement in 2018, CSE was reconstituted as Central, Southeastern Europe and Central Asia (CESA), covering 29 countries, which he led, and after EY Global reorganization, effective July 2025, he became Regional Managing Partner for EY Europe Central Region, overseeing 33 countries.

In his role as EY Poland’s Country Managing Partner, he actively supports social, cultural and educational initiatives, including work on benefits foster families through the EY Foundation. Since 2015 he has served on the Program Council of the Women’s Leadership Foundation, which promotes gender equality on company boards and executive teams.

He engages in developing future leaders through mentoring and collaboration with educational programmes. As an EY leader, he emphasises values-based leadership and the development of talent in diverse professional environments.

He also promotes business engagement in culture – under his leadership EY Poland has for years been a patron of the Museum of Modern Art in Warsaw, supporting the institution’s educational and artistic activities. As part of this cooperation, EY supports exhibitions, workshops and events promoting contemporary art in Poland.

He is active in promoting Polish entrepreneurship at home and abroad. Within the EY Entrepreneur of the Year programme, over the past twenty years nearly seventy business owners have received awards and distinctions. In May 2025, on the occasion of Bankier.pl’s 25th anniversary, he was included in its “25 Aces” ranking of leaders of the Polish financial market.

== Personal life ==
Jacek is married and a father of five. He is passionate about sports (running, mountain hiking, cycling, and skiing), and a literature and history enthusiast.
