= Nadyby =

Village in Lviv Oblast, Ukraine

Nadyby Надиби
- Village
- Location within Lviv Oblast
- Coordinates: 49°33′04″N 23°04′02″E
- Country: Ukraine
- Oblast: Lviv Oblast
- District: Sambir Raion
- Established: 1446

Area
  - Total: 1,959 km^{2} (756 sq mi)
- Elevation /(average value of): 306 m (1,004 ft)

Population (2024)
  - Total: ▼975
  - Density: 62,328/km^{2} (161,430/sq mi)
- Time zone: UTC+2 (EET)
  - Summer (DST): UTC+3 (EEST)
- Postal code: 82054
- Area code: +380 3238
- Website: село Надиби^{(Ukrainian)}

Nadyby (Ukrainian: Нади́би) – village (selo) in Sambir Raion, Lviv Oblast, of western Ukraine. It belongs to Biskovychi rural hromada, one of the hromadas of Ukraine. The village is small and has an area of 1,959 km^{2} and is currently living in the village of about 1197 persons. Local government is administered by Susidovytska village council.

== Geography ==
The village is located on the territory Susidovytska village council at a distance 21 kilometres (13 mi) from the district center Staryi Sambir. It is situated in the 88 kilometres (55 mi) from the regional center Lviv and 13 kilometres (8.1 mi) from the city Sambir.

== History and Attractions ==
The village is known from the 1125 year, although the official founding date and the first record of the village dates back to 1446 year. The village was owned by the Polish magnates up to middle of the 19th century.

Until 18 July 2020, Nadyby belonged to Staryi Sambir Raion. The raion was abolished in July 2020 as part of the administrative reform of Ukraine, which reduced the number of raions of Lviv Oblast to seven. The area of Staryi Sambir Raion was merged into Sambir Raion.

In the village was an architectural monument of Sambir Raion - Church of the Assumption of the Virgin Mary 1732 (wooden). But the old church was dismantled and her was transferred to Lviv, Museum of Folk Architecture and Rural Life Shevchenko Hai. In the village was built a new church, Church of St Demetrius of Thessaloniki. In 2008 was built one more church of the Assumption.

== Literature ==
- Історія міст і сіл УРСР : Львівська область, Сусідичі. – К. : ГРУРЕ, 1968 р. Page 786 (in Ukrainian)
- Надиби, Василь Чубик (in Ukrainian)
