= Wał-Ruda =

- Village
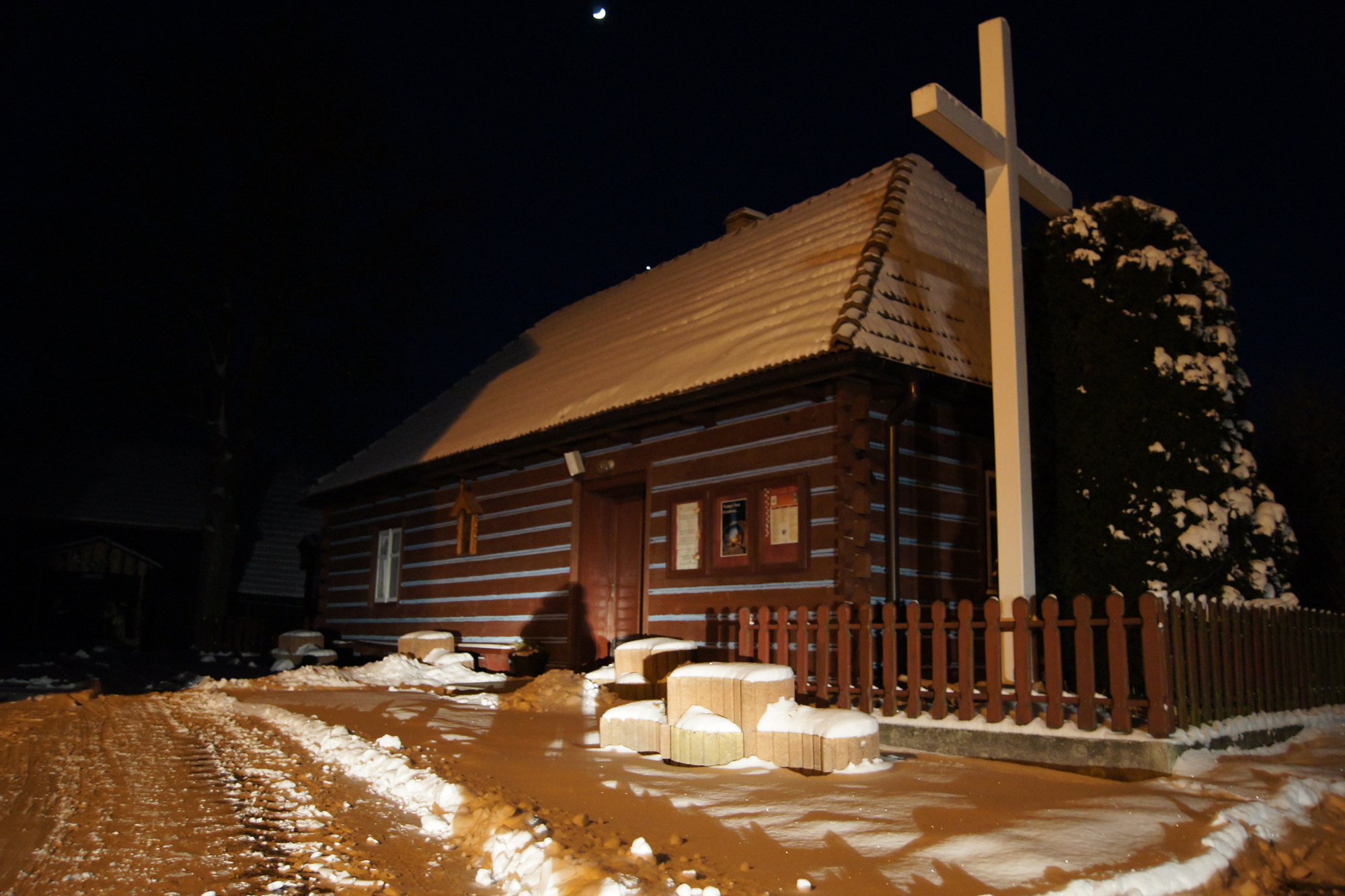
- Renovated house of Blessed Karolina Kózka

- Location within Poland
- Coordinates: 50°06′47″N 20°47′09″E
- Country: Poland
- Voivodeship: Lesser Poland
- County: Tarnów
- Gmina: Radłów

Wał-Ruda [ˈvau̯ ˈruda] is a village in the administrative district of Gmina Radłów, within Tarnów County, Lesser Poland Voivodeship, in southern Poland.
