= Voiutychi =

Rural locality in Lviv Oblast, Ukraine

Voiutychi Воютичі
- Village
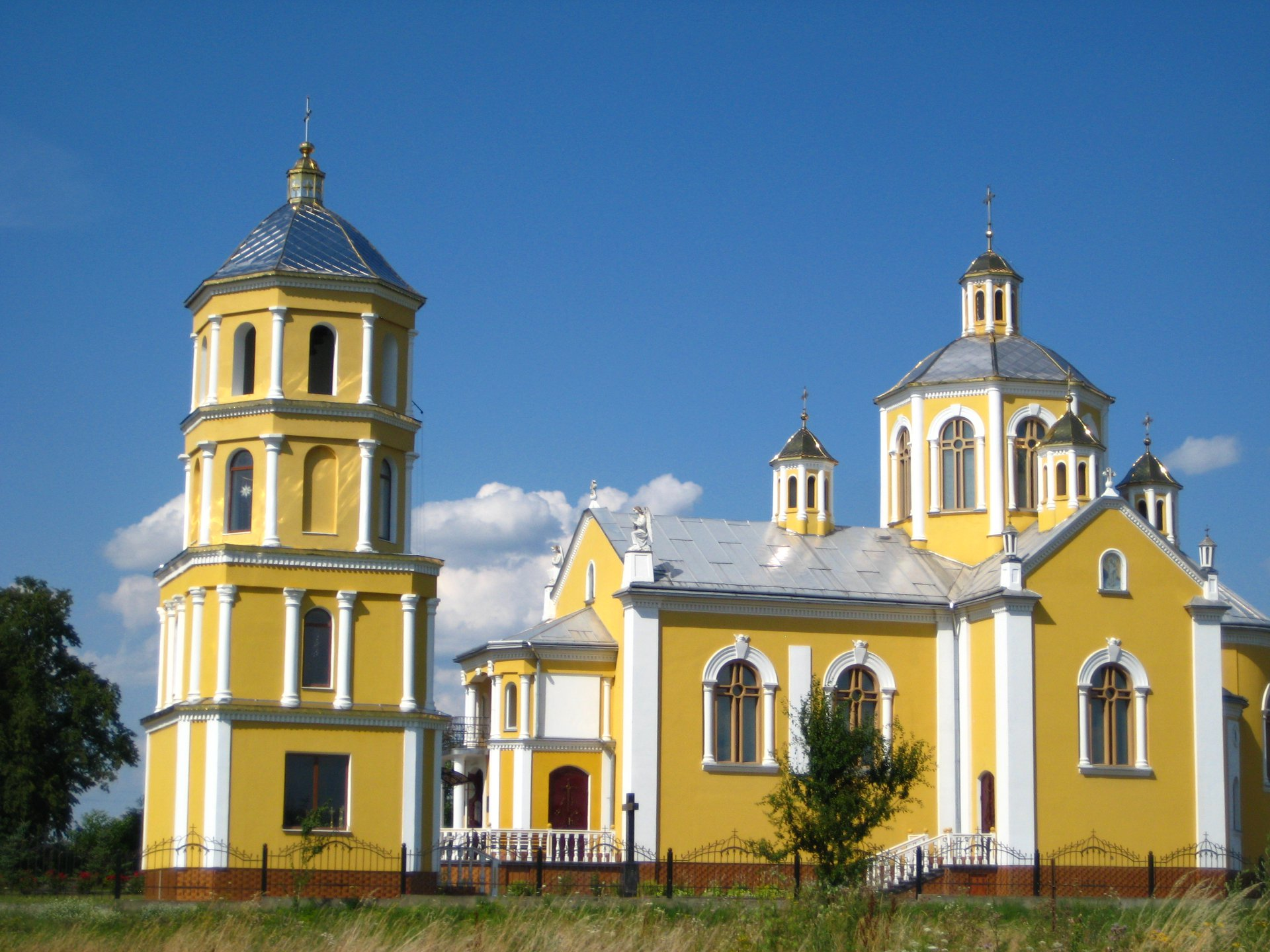

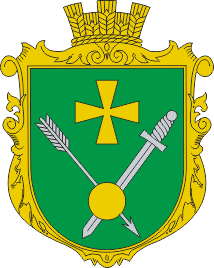
- Coat of arms

- Location within Lviv Oblast Location within Ukraine
- Coordinates: 49°33′29″N 23°05′23″E
- Country: Ukraine
- Oblast: Lviv
- Raion: Sambir
- Area: 12.72 km^{2} (4.91 sq mi)
- Population (2025): 1,897 ▼
  - Density: 149.1/km^{2} (386.3/sq mi)

Voiutychi (Ukrainian: Воютичі, Polish: Wojutycze) is a village (selo) in Sambir Raion, Lviv Oblast, in south-west Ukraine. Voiutychi belongs to Biskovychi rural hromada, one of the hromadas of Ukraine.

The village was first mentioned in 1423.
