= Glów =

- Village
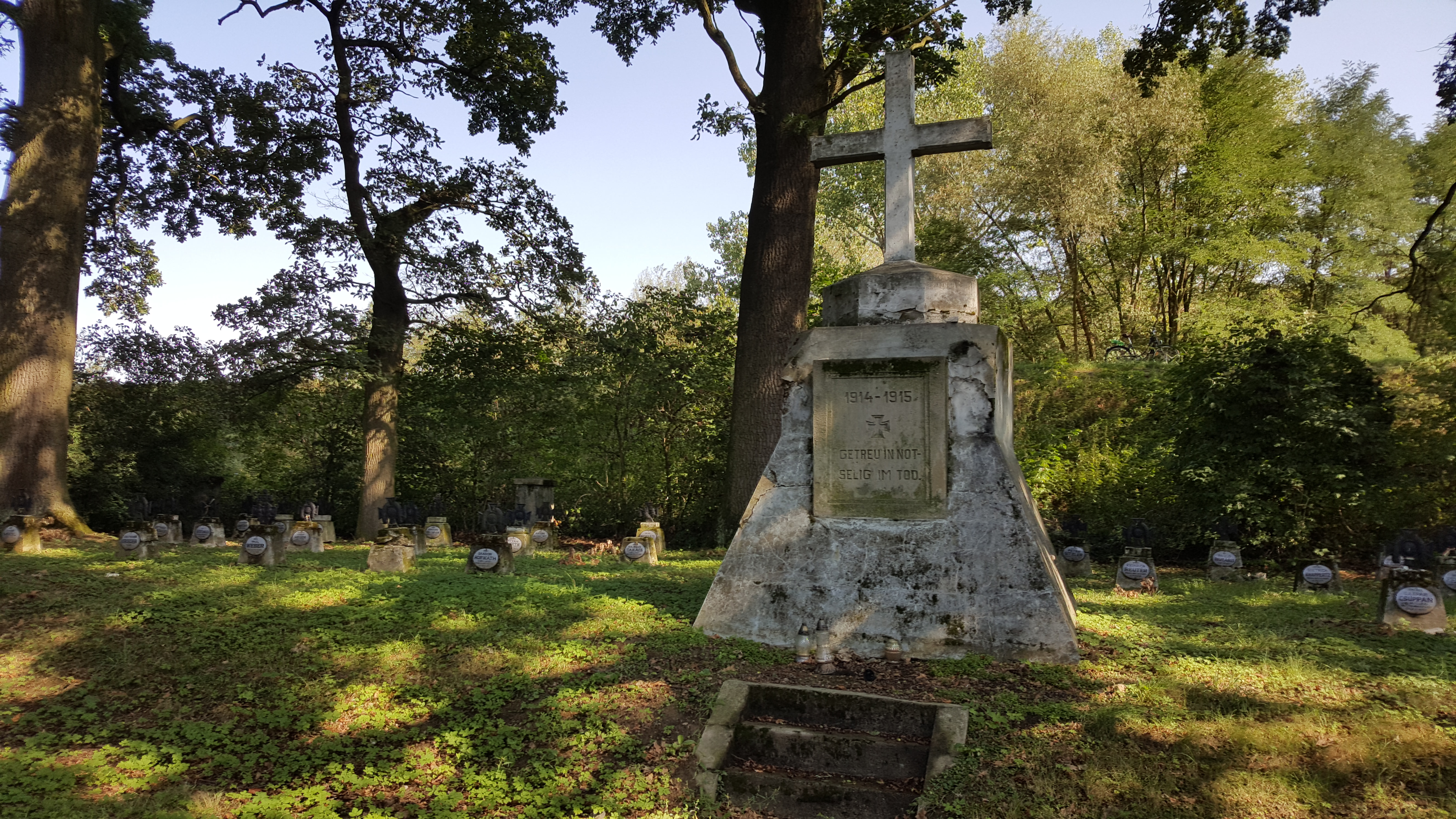
- World War I Cemetery in Glów

- Location within Poland
- Coordinates: 50°06′00″N 20°52′24″E
- Country: Poland
- Voivodeship: Lesser Poland
- County: Tarnów
- Gmina: Radłów

Glów [ɡluf] is a village in the administrative district of Gmina Radłów. It is within Tarnów County, Lesser Poland Voivodeship in southern Poland.

== Monuments ==
The object is entered into the register of immovable monuments of the Małopolska Voivodeship.

- War cemetery no. 209 from World War I
