= Niwka, Tarnów County =

Niwka
- Village
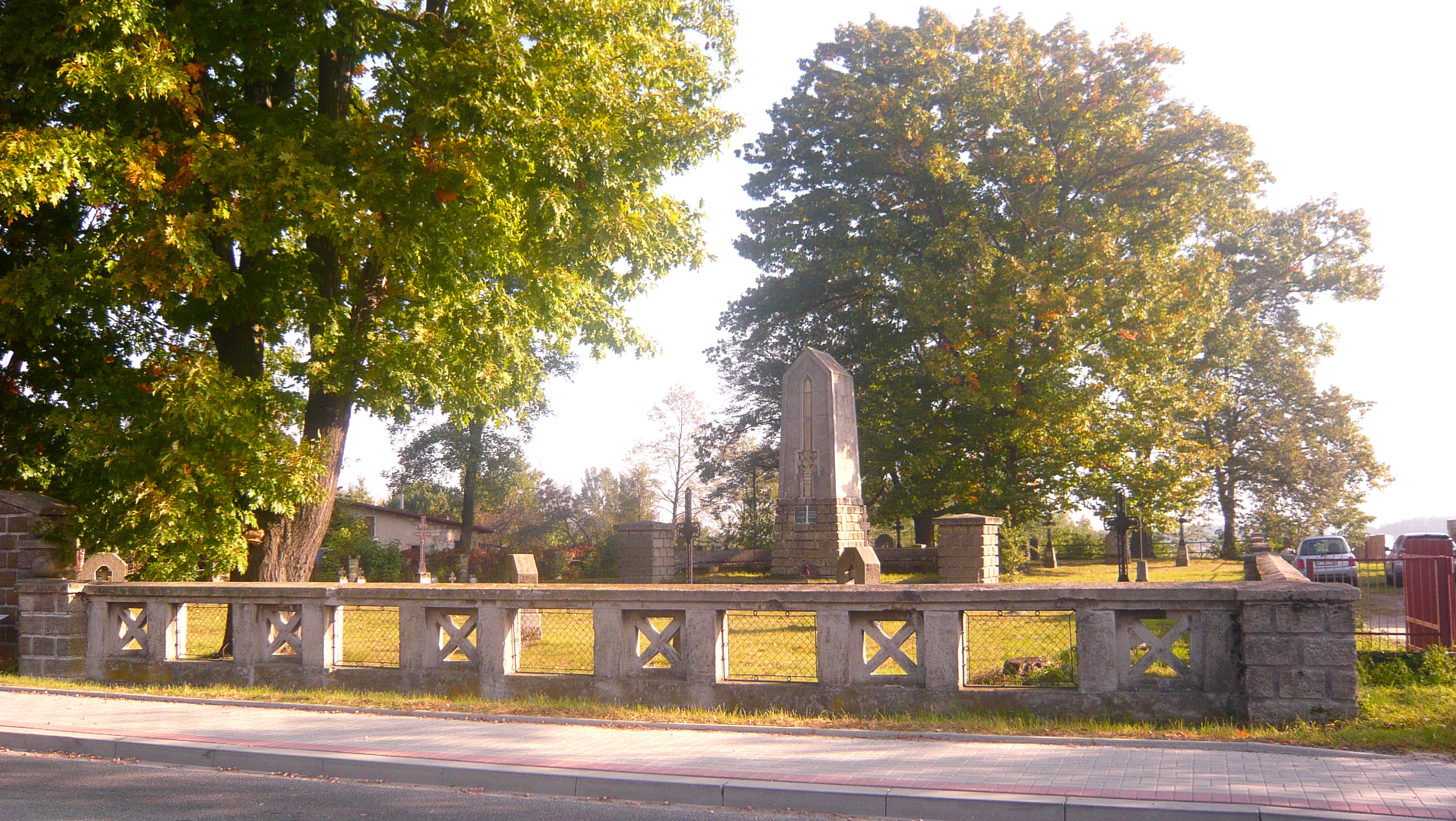
- War cemetery

- Location within Poland
- Coordinates: 50°3′N 20°51′E
- Country: Poland
- Voivodeship: Lesser Poland
- County: Tarnów
- Gmina: Radłów

Niwka [ˈnifka] is a village in the administrative district of Gmina Radłów, within Tarnów County, Lesser Poland Voivodeship, in southern Poland.
