= Łęka Siedlecka =

- Village
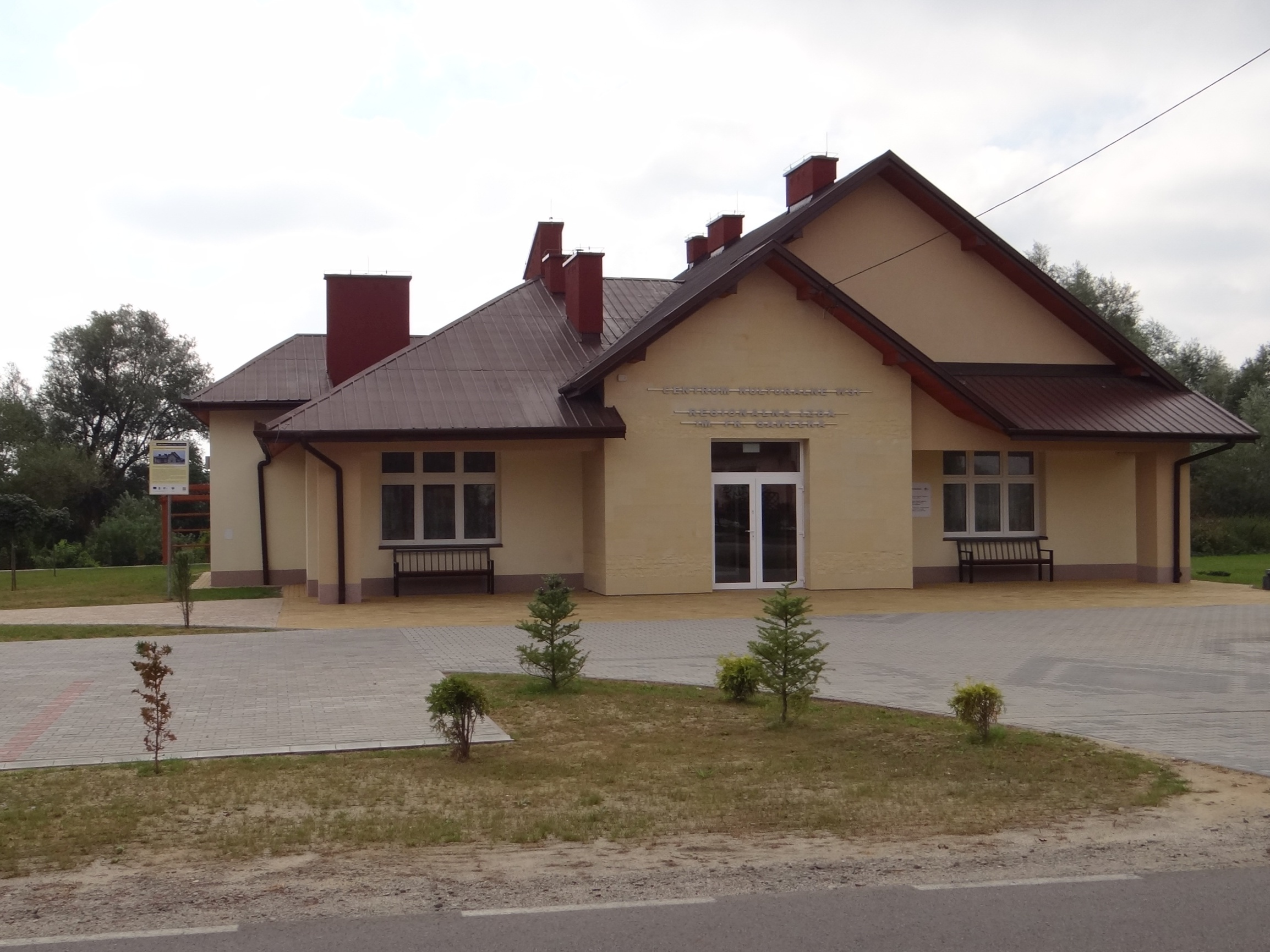
- Culture centre

- Location within Poland
- Coordinates: 50°05′06″N 20°52′09″E
- Country: Poland
- Voivodeship: Lesser Poland
- County: Tarnów
- Gmina: Radłów

Łęka Siedlecka [ˈwɛnka ɕɛˈdlɛt͡ska] is a village in the administrative district of Gmina Radłów, within Tarnów County, Lesser Poland Voivodeship, in southern Poland.
