= Sanoka =

- Village
- Location within Poland
- Coordinates: 50°05′43″N 20°52′52″E
- Country: Poland
- Voivodeship: Lesser Poland
- County: Tarnów
- Gmina: Radłów

Sanoka [saˈnɔka] is a village in the administrative district of Gmina Radłów, within Tarnów County, Lesser Poland Voivodeship, in southern Poland.
