= Gmina Radłów, Lesser Poland Voivodeship =

Gmina Radłów Radłów Commune
- Gmina
- Flag Coat of arms

- Location within Poland
- Coordinates (Radłów): 50°5′N 20°51′E
- Country: Poland
- Voivodeship: Lesser Poland
- County: Tarnów County
- Seat: Radłów

Government
  - Mayor: Mateusz Grzegorz Borowiec

Area
  - Total: 86.02 km^{2} (33.21 sq mi)

Population (2006)
  - Total: 9,774
  - Density: 113.6/km^{2} (294.3/sq mi)
- Time zone: UTC+1 (CET)
  - Summer (DST): UTC+2 (CEST)
- Number Zone: (+48) 14
- Vehicle registration: KTA
- Website: www.gminaradlow.pl

Gmina Radłów is an urban-rural gmina (administrative district) in Tarnów County, Lesser Poland Voivodeship, in southern Poland. Its seat is the town of Radłów, which lies approximately 13 kilometres (8 mi) north-west of Tarnów and 66 km (41 mi) east of the regional capital Kraków.

The gmina covers an area of 86.02 square kilometres (33.2 sq mi), and, as of 2006, its total population is 9,774.

== Villages ==
Apart from the town of Radłów, Gmina Radłów contains the villages and settlements of Biskupice Radłowskie, Brzeźnica, Glów, Łęka Siedlecka, Marcinkowice, Niwka, Przybysławice, Sanoka, Siedlec, Wał-Ruda, Wola Radłowska, Zabawa, and Zdrochec.

== Neighbouring gminas ==
Gmina Radłów is bordered by the gminas of Borzęcin, Szczurowa, Wierzchosławice, Wietrzychowice, and Żabno.
