= Biskovychi rural hromada =

Hromada in Lviv Oblast, Ukraine

Biskovychi rural hromada Бісковицька сільська громада
- Hromada
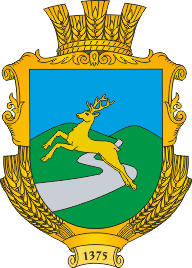
- Seal
- Interactive map of Biskovychi rural hromada
- Country: Ukraine
- Oblast: Lviv Oblast
- Raion: Sambir Raion
- Admin. center: Biskovychi

Area
  - Total: 2,158 km^{2} (833 sq mi)

Population (2021)
  - Total: 17,999
  - Density: 8.341/km^{2} (21.60/sq mi)
- CATOTTG code: UA46080010000010628
- Settlements: 32
- Villages: 32
- Website: biskovycka-gromada.gov.ua

Biskovychi rural hromada (Ukrainian: Бісковицька сільська громада) is a hromada in Ukraine, in Sambir Raion of Lviv Oblast. The administrative center is the village of Biskovychi.

== Settlements ==
The hromada consists of 32 villages:

- Baranivtsi
- Berestiany
- Bylychi
- Biskovychi
- Bukova
- Verbivka
- Verkhivtsi
- Vykoty
- Vladypil
- Volytsia
- Volia-Baranetska
- Voiutychi
- Zarichchia
- Zarichchia
- Koloniia
- Kopan
- Krasnytsia
- Lanovychi
- Liutovyska
- Maksymovychi
- Mala Verbivka
- Mali Baranivtsi
- Mizhhaitsi
- Nadyby
- Pianovychi
- Rakova
- Rohizno
- Rudnia
- Sadkovychi
- Susidovychi
- Tarava
- Yazy
