= Brzeźnica, Tarnów County =

Brzeźnica
- Village
- Location within Poland
- Coordinates: 50°4′48″N 20°48′19″E
- Country: Poland
- Voivodeship: Lesser Poland
- County: Tarnów
- Gmina: Radłów
- Population: 124

Brzeźnica [bʐɛʑˈnit͡sa] is a village in the administrative district of Gmina Radłów, within Tarnów County, Lesser Poland Voivodeship, in southern Poland.
