= Berestiany =

Rural locality in Lviv Oblast, Ukraine

Berestiany Берестяни
- Village
- Location within Ukraine
- Coordinates: 49°36′21″N 23°05′33″E
- Country: Ukraine
- Oblast: Lviv Oblast
- Raion: Sambir Raion
- Hromada: Biskovychi rural hromada
- Area: 7.315 km^{2} (2.824 sq mi)
- Population: 699
  - Density: 95.6/km^{2} (247/sq mi)

Berestiany (Ukrainian: Берестяни; Polish: Brześciany) is a village (selo) in Sambir Raion, Lviv Oblast, in south-west Ukraine. Volia-Berestiany belongs to Biskovychi rural hromada, one of the hromadas of Ukraine.

The village was first mentioned in 1469. The local Orthodox church was mentioned in 1507. In the interwar period the village belonged to Poland. A Catholic parish was erected in 1920. Before World War 2 Berestiany had around 1,200 inhabitants, one third of them were Poles.
