= Biskupice Radłowskie =

- Village
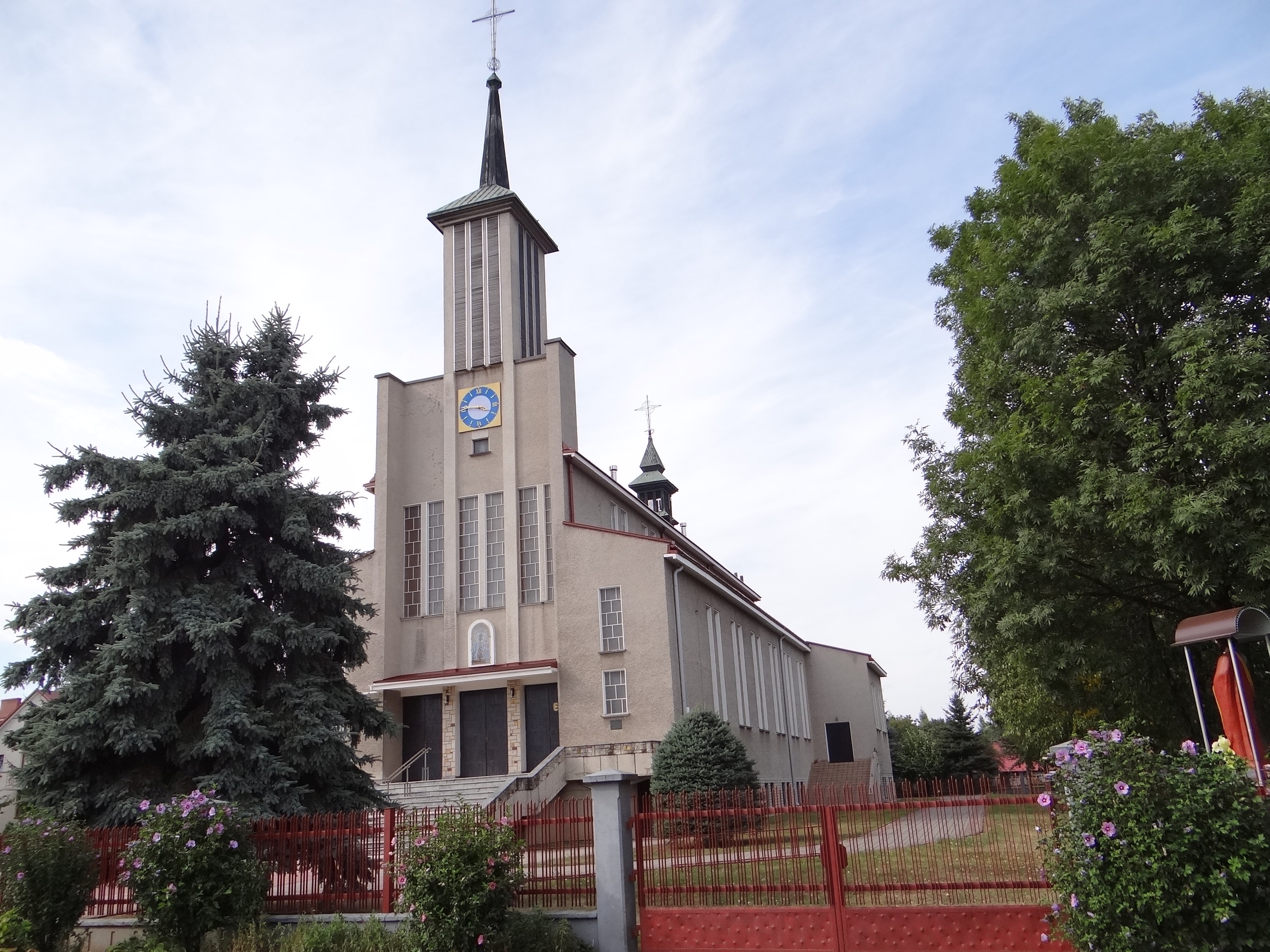
- Church of Our Lady of Częstochowa

- Location within Poland
- Coordinates: 50°8′N 20°52′E
- Country: Poland
- Voivodeship: Lesser Poland
- County: Tarnów
- Gmina: Radłów

Population
  - Total: 1,100

Biskupice Radłowskie [biskuˈpit͡sɛ raˈdwɔfskʲɛ] is a village in the administrative district of Gmina Radłów, within Tarnów County, Lesser Poland Voivodeship, in southern Poland.
