= Siedlec, Tarnów County =

Siedlec
- Village
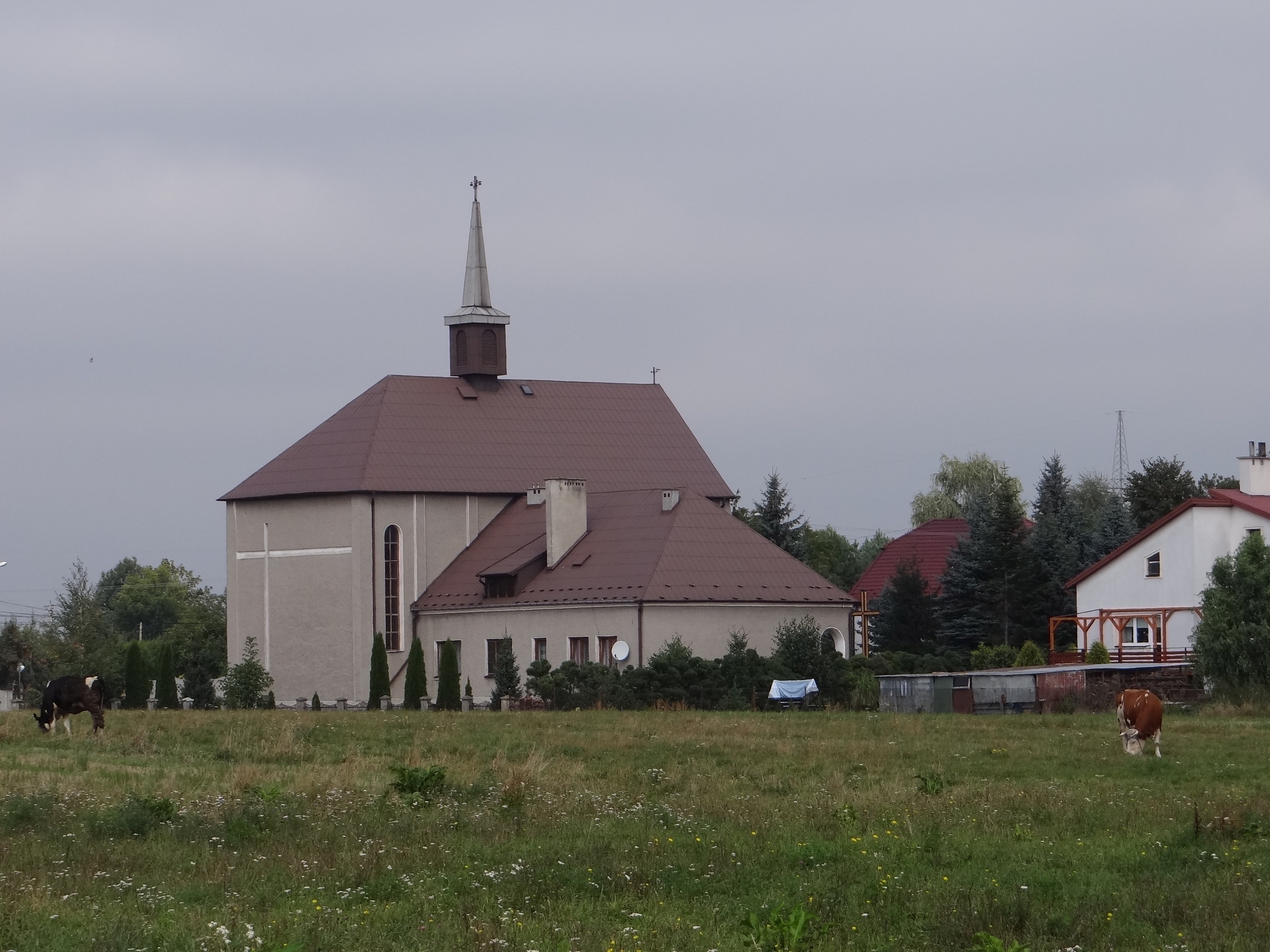
- Manor house in Siedlec, Tarnów County

- Location within Poland
- Coordinates: 50°04′33″N 20°53′27″E
- Country: Poland
- Voivodeship: Lesser Poland
- County: Tarnów
- Gmina: Radłów

Siedlec [ˈɕɛdlɛt͡s] is a village in the administrative district of Gmina Radłów, within Tarnów County, Lesser Poland Voivodeship, in southern Poland.
