= Lanovychi =

Rural locality in Lviv Oblast, Ukraine

Lanovychi Лановичі
- Village
- Location within Ukraine
- Coordinates: 49°35′07″N 23°14′11″E
- Country: Ukraine
- Oblast: Lviv
- Raion: Sambir
- Area: 9.5 km^{2} (3.7 sq mi)
- Population: 653
  - Density: 69/km^{2} (180/sq mi)

Lanovychi (Ukrainian: Лановичі, Polish: Łanowice) is a village (selo) in Sambir Raion, Lviv Oblast, in south-west Ukraine. It belongs to Biskovychi rural hromada, one of the hromadas of Ukraine.

The local Catholic parish was first mentioned in 1462.
