= Wola Radłowska =

- Village
- Location within Poland
- Coordinates: 50°5′44″N 20°49′3″E
- Country: Poland
- Voivodeship: Lesser Poland
- County: Tarnów
- Gmina: Radłów
- Population: 1,060

Wola Radłowska [ˈvɔla radˈwɔfska] is a village in the administrative district of Gmina Radłów, within Tarnów County, Lesser Poland Voivodeship, in southern Poland.
