= Tarava =

- Village
- Tarabha
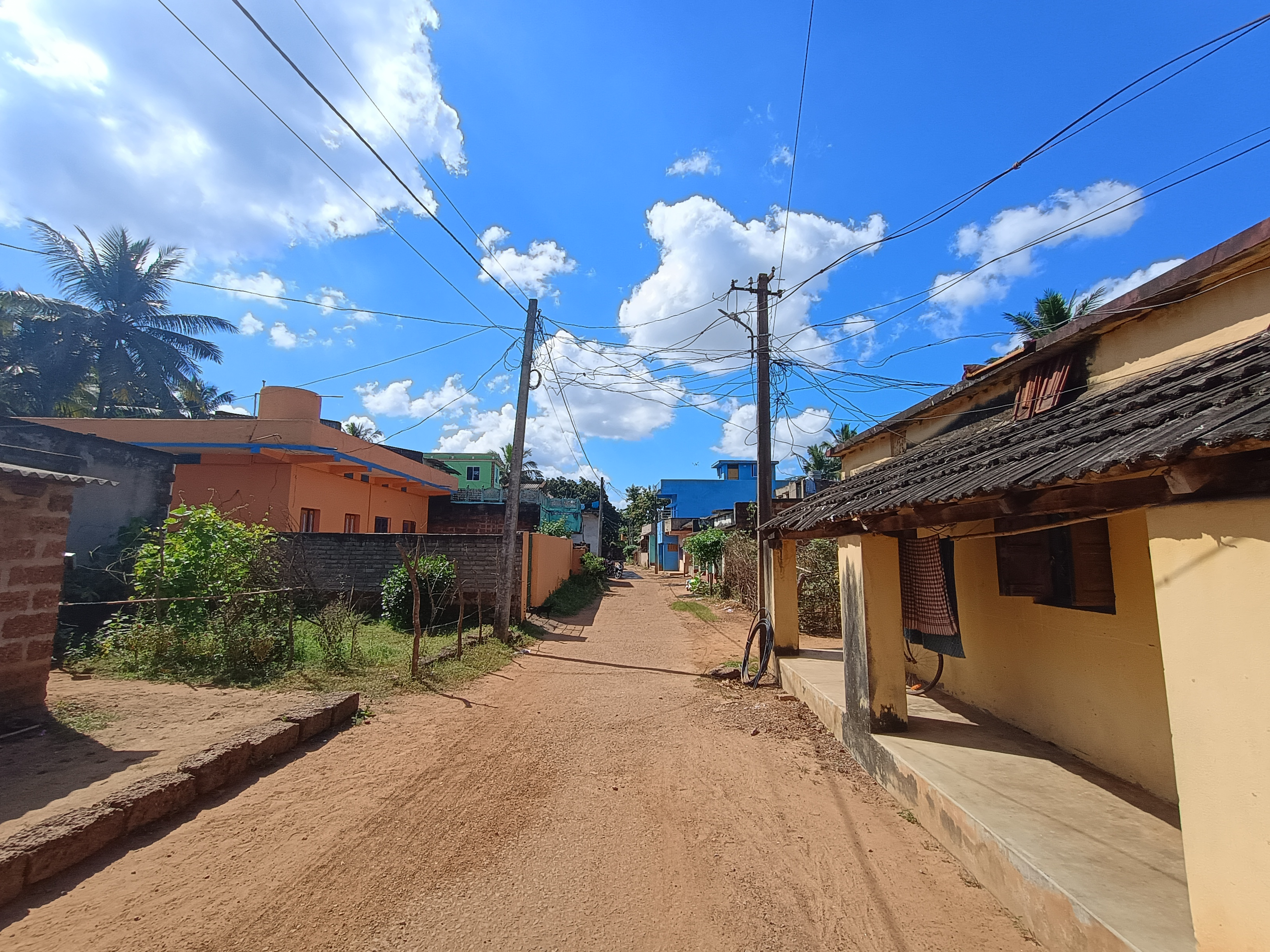
- Khalibandha village of Tarava GP
- Interactive map of Tarava
- Coordinates: 20°43′31″N 85°36′04″E
- Seat: Sarpanch

Government
  - Type: Local government in India
  - Body: Government of Odisha
  - Sarpanch: Pratima Behera (Biju Janata Dal)

Area
  - Total: 768 ha (1,900 acres)

Population (2011)
  - Total: 2,858
- Time zone: UTC+5:30 (IST)
- Postal code: 759013

Tarava (officially Tarabha), is a Gram panchayat in Odisha's Dhenkanal district. It is 7 km away from Dhenkanal Town. The nearest railway station is Dhenkanal railway station, around 9 km away

The villages that come under the Tarava Gram Panchayat are:

- Tarava
- Khalibandha
- Nimataila
- Kotapala
- Haldigundi
- Bangala Sahi
- Keutabereni
