= Radłów =

- Town
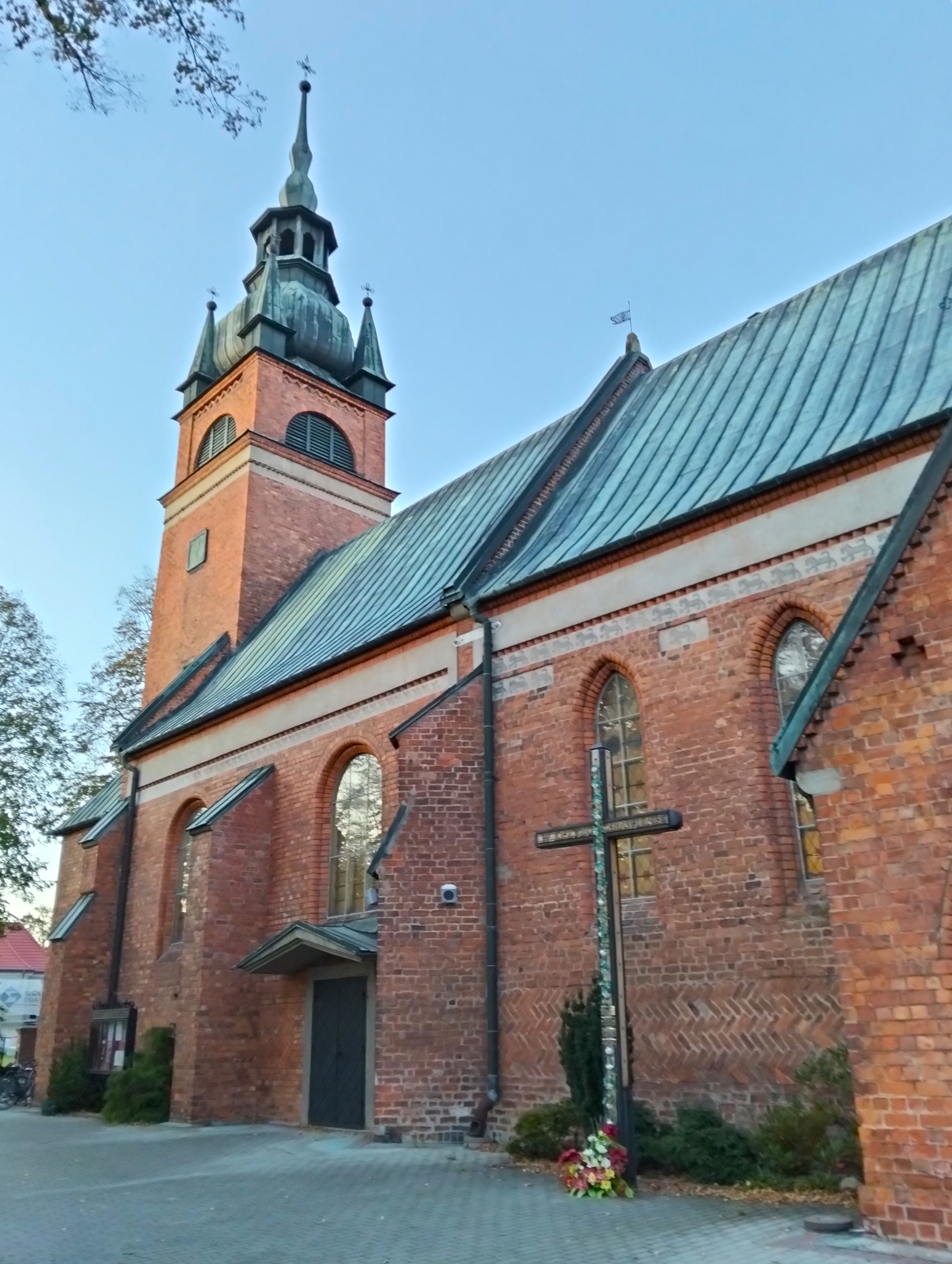
- Saint John Church

- Flag Coat of arms

- Location within Poland
- Coordinates: 50°5′N 20°51′E
- Country: Poland
- Voivodeship: Lesser Poland
- County: Tarnów
- Gmina: Radłów

Population
  - Total: 2,800
- Time zone: UTC+1 (CET)
  - Summer (DST): UTC+2 (CEST)
- Vehicle registration: KTA
- Website: http://www.gminaradlow.pl

Radłów [ˈradwuf] is a town in Tarnów County, Lesser Poland Voivodeship, in southern Poland. It is the seat of the gmina (administrative district) called Gmina Radłów.

The town has a population of 2,800.

It has three schools and a park.

== History ==
The first historical notes mentioning Radłów can be found in the Cracow Cathedral Code (1080), when a parish was established in Radłów. During the first Mongol invasion of Poland, in 1241, the church was destroyed and the populace fled the invaders to the nearby forest. A new church was erected only in 1337 and modernized in the 17th century. Radłów was visited by Cardinal Archbishop of Kraków Zbigniew Oleśnicki in 1448 and 1450. In 1655, the area was ravaged by Swedish troops when a major battle of the Second Northern War took place near Radłów. Two years later, the Hungarian army devastated the town again. Radłów was often threatened or partly destroyed by the floods of the Dunajec (1270, 1468, 1533, 1844, 1903).

After the First Partition of Poland (1772), the town belonged to the Austrian Empire, later to the Austro-Hungarian Monarchy. The second half of the 19th century saw increased emigration to Germany and the United States. In the first battles of the First World War 1914, Radłów and its environs were heavily destroyed. With the end of World War I, in 1918, Poland regained independence and control of Radłów. In 1934, the town suffered one of the largest floods in its history. Following the German-Soviet invasion of Poland, which started World War II in September 1939, the town was occupied by Germany.

It gained the status of a town on 1 January 2010.
