= Zdrochec =

- Village
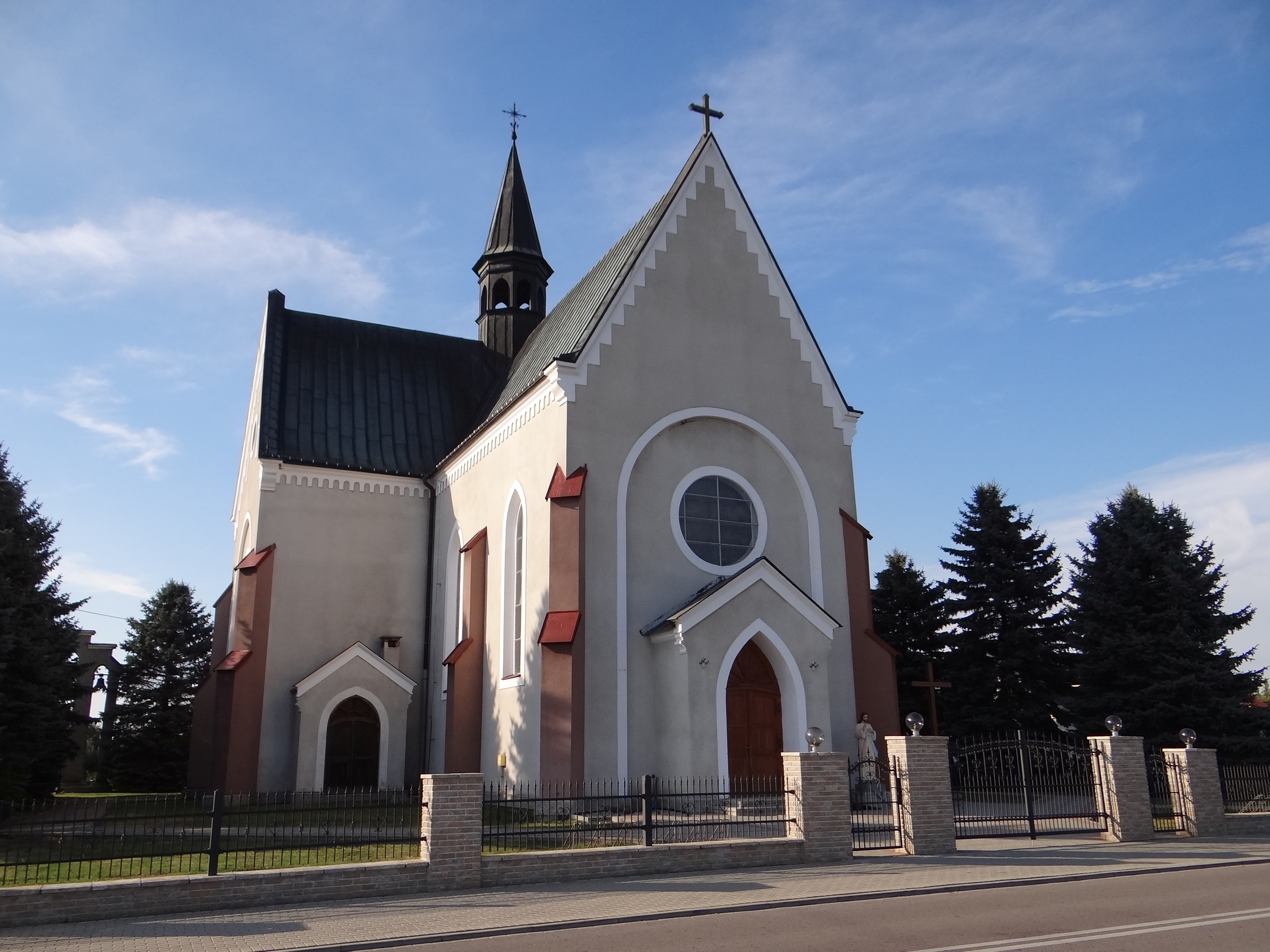
- Catholic church

- Location within Poland
- Coordinates: 50°8′N 20°50′E
- Country: Poland
- Voivodeship: Lesser Poland
- County: Tarnów
- Gmina: Radłów

Zdrochec [ˈzdrɔxɛt͡s] is a village in the administrative district of Gmina Radłów, within Tarnów County, Lesser Poland Voivodeship, in southern Poland.
