= Volia-Baranetska =

Rural locality in Lviv Oblast, Ukraine

Volia-Baranetska Воля-Баранецька
- Village
- Location within Lviv Oblast Location within Ukraine
- Coordinates: 49°36′49″N 23°07′27″E
- Country: Ukraine
- Oblast: Lviv Oblast
- Raion: Sambir Raion
- Established: 1462

Population
  - Total: 641
- Website: Ukrainian Parliament website

Volia-Baranetska (Ukrainian: Воля-Баранецька) is a village (selo) in western Ukraine, in Sambir Raion (district) of Lviv Oblast (province). Volia-Baranetska belongs to Biskovychi rural hromada, one of the hromadas of Ukraine. Before the new administrative divisions of Ukraine were introduced in 2020, it was located at the three-way administrative border with Mostyska Raion and Staryi Sambir Raion.
