= Zabawa, Tarnów County =

Zabawa
- Village
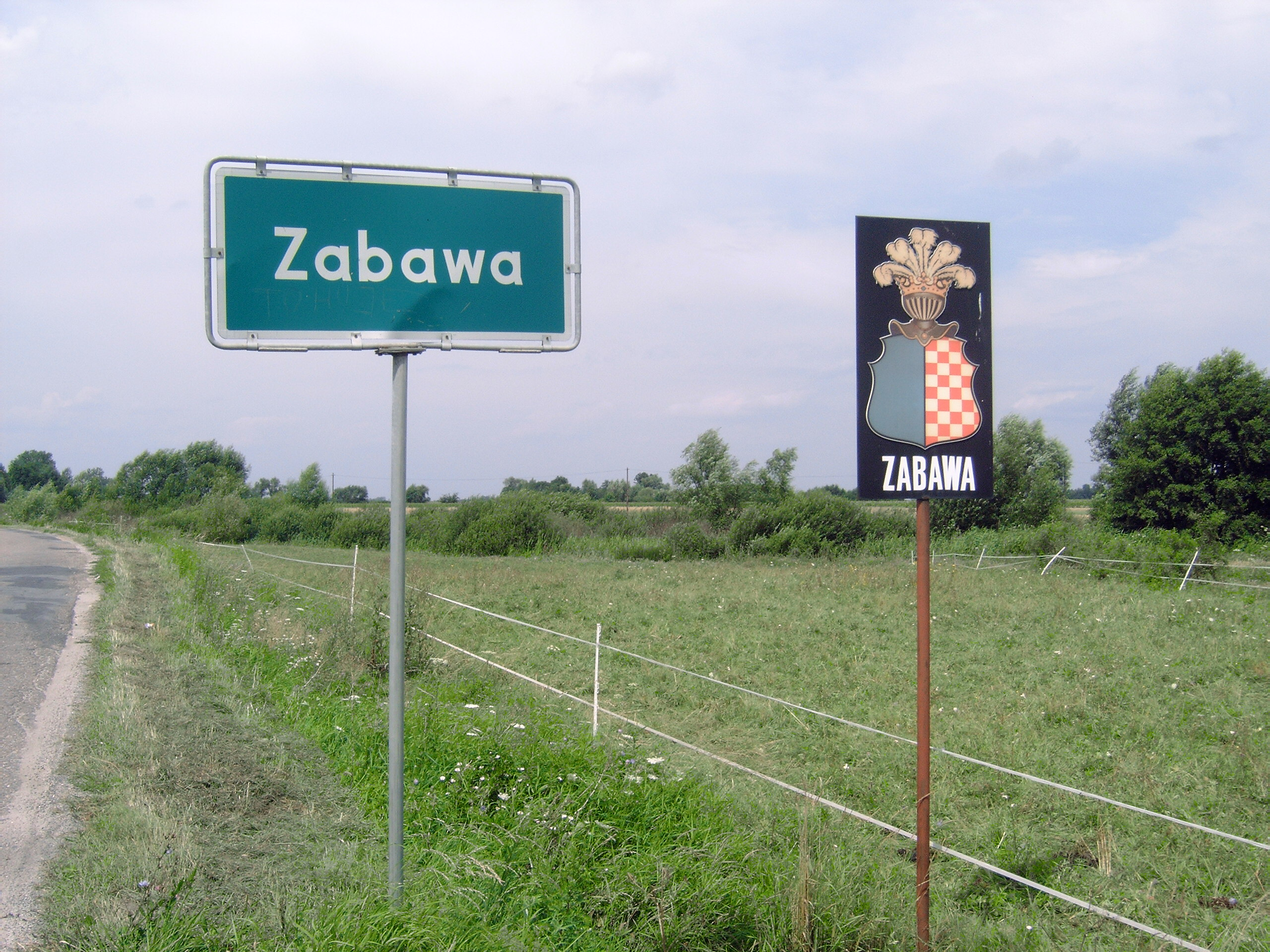

- Location within Poland
- Coordinates: 50°7′13″N 20°49′29″E
- Country: Poland
- Voivodeship: Lesser Poland
- County: Tarnów
- Gmina: Radłów

Zabawa [zaˈbava] (translation: Fun) is a village in the administrative district of Gmina Radłów, within Tarnów County, Lesser Poland Voivodeship, in southern Poland.
