= St Willibrordus, Hulst =

Church building in the Netherlands

Basilica of Saint Willibrord
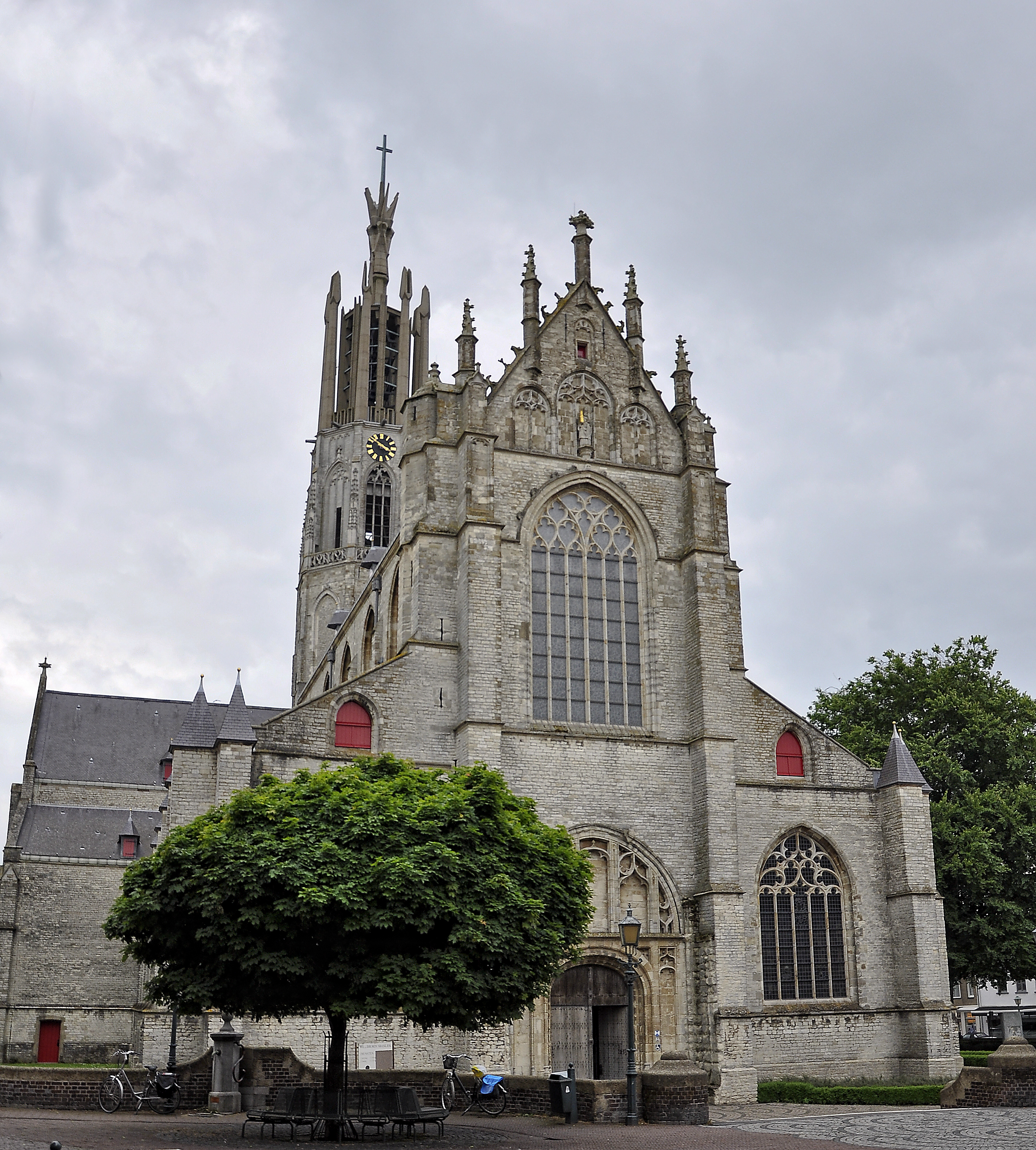
- Basilica of St. Willibrordus

Religion
- Affiliation: Roman Catholic
- Province: Zeelandic Flanders
- Ecclesiastical or organizational status: Basilica

Location
- Location: Hulst, Netherlands
- Interactive map of Basilica of Saint Willibrord
- Coordinates: 51°16′50″N 4°3′14″E

Architecture
- Architects: Jan Brouwer, Everaert Spoorwater, Laurens II Keldermans
- Style: Brabantine Gothic
- Groundbreaking: 13th century
- Completed: 1535

St Willibrordus is a basilica located in the center of the fortress city of Hulst in the east of Zeelandic Flanders, the Netherlands. The church is dedicated to the missionary St. Willibrord, often called the apostle of the Benelux countries (Belgium, the Netherlands, and Luxembourg). Although the nave dates from the 13th to 15th centuries, the central tower was destroyed several times, most recently in the Second World War. The current tower's modern appearance dates from the 1950s. The church contains the painting The Good Samaritan by Jan Baptist Maes (1794–1856) from Ghent. The scenes of the Way of the Cross were painted by Jan Jozef Deloose (1769–1849) from Sint-Niklaas. The frames are by the Ghent sculptor P. Pauwels.

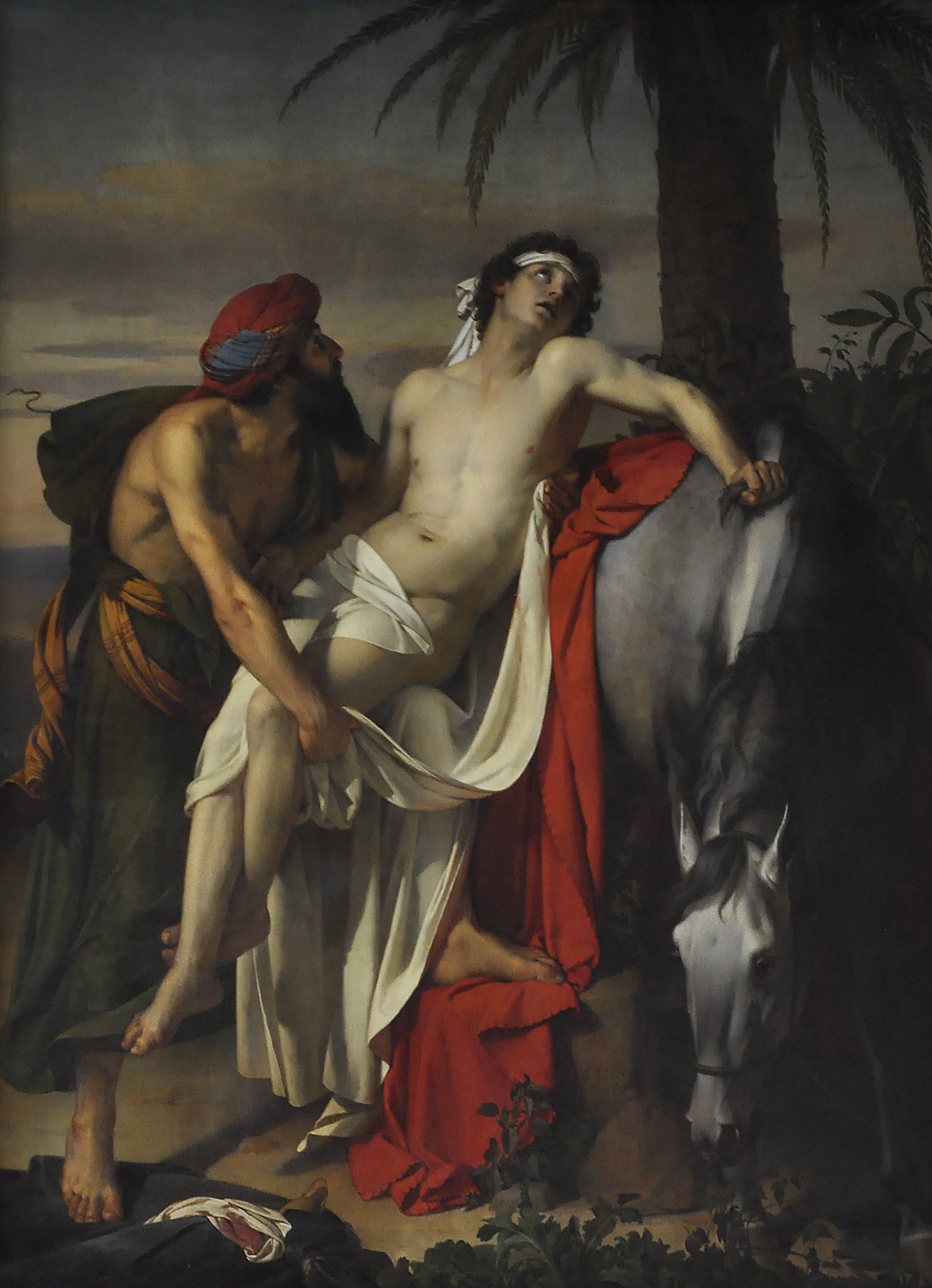

== Exterior ==
The first small Romanesque church building was erected around 1200 at the foot of a mote. In the first half of the 15th century it was replaced by a church in Gothic style, more precisely in Brabantine Gothic. The striking crossing tower was also built during that period. From 1462 the church was rebuilt to its current form under the supervision of the master builder Everaert Spoorwater. When a fire broke out during the works, the tower and the nave were completely reduced to ashes, as well as the newly built choir. Due to the death of Spoorwater, the works were only restarted on 3 May 1481, this time under the supervision of the Antwerp architect Herman de Waeghemazeker. He engaged Matthijs II Keldermans (from 1482 to 1484) for the construction of the main door. The construction of the church was completed by his great-nephew Laurens II Keldermans (ca. 1534), and it was completed in 1535. The main entrance to the basilica is located in the west façade on the Steenstraat side. At the top of this façade in a niche is a statue of Saint Willibrord with a gilded church tower in his hands. Unlike the choir church, the nave is not equipped with flying buttresses and buttresses. The bases for the flying buttresses are built of masonry. During the restoration of the 1930s, vaults were built under the original wooden ceiling in the nave. The lateral pressure that these exert on the masonry is absorbed by means of tension rods. Ledestone is a fairly soft limestone type that is easy to work, but has the disadvantage that it is highly susceptible to erosion. The spire is made of prestressed concrete from 1957. The bells are surrounded by tuning forks and at the top angels are turned towards the crucifix.

== Interior ==
St. Willibrordus is built in the shape of a Latin cross. The building parts are grouped around the tower that is centrally located in the church typical of Flemish ecclesiastical architecture. The choir church has a choir aisle on the east end of the basilica from which eight rectangular side chapels and three polygonal radial chapels extend. These chapels were originally built for the craft guilds who worked in Hulst. To the left and right of the main altar are the conopeum (red-yellow parasol or umbrellino), the tintinnabulum (the bell), the insignia of a basilica.

In the years 1841–1842 the interior of the Catholic choir section was completely painted. These paintings were removed in the early 1930s, among other things to create more uniformity within the church. The gold paint on the cabbage leaves of the capitals was found to be impossible to remove without risk of damage. The first chapel on the north side of the choir is used as a baptistery. The baptismal font is made of stone: the copper lid is decorated with a picture of John the Baptist. At the third chapel a door and an open pointed arch can be seen at the top. The door gives access to the former library in which the books belonging to the church were kept. In the period that St. Willibrordus was a simultaneous church for Catholics and Protestants from 1806 to 1929, the library served as a sacristy. In the middle radial chapel at the far east of the church is kept a medallion of Mary, which originally was in one of the bells. After the tower fire of 1876, this medallion was found in the melted chimes.

== Second World War ==
During the Second World War, the tower served as a military lookout for German troops stationed in the Netherlands. On the bell in the tower, soldiers inscribed '1940', 'Gott strafe England' and a swastika. Elsewhere in the attic of the church, German text with swastika were scrawled on walls.

With the intention of disabling the German lookout post, during their advance through the east of Zeelandic Flanders the first regiment of the Polish Panzer Division shelled the church tower. About seventy shells hit their target and most of the tower burned on 18 September 1944. Hulst was liberated the following day.

== Basilica ==
Coat of arms of the church, displaying the ombrellino (umbrella) and tintinnabulum (bells) of a basilica and the motto meaning "Happily in the name of God"

The church was built as a Roman Catholic church, but became a Dutch Reformed church during the Eighty Years' War at the hands of Frederik Hendrik. This remained so until the time of Napoleon, when it was turned into a simultaneous church: the choir was given to the Catholics and the nave remained available to the Protestants. A wall was built in between. The church has been completely Catholic again since 1929 when they bought the building from the Protestants who now have their own church on the Houtmarkt. As a result of this, Pope Pius XI elevated the church to a basilica on 24 November 1935.

== Spire ==
The spire has been replaced several times. The first spire was destroyed in 1668 by lightning. In 1724 a new spire was installed in the classicist style. It was destroyed by fire in 1876. A new tower was then placed after a design by Pierre Cuypers, because the tower was a viewpoint over the Western Scheldt. It was destroyed in 1944 by Polish liberators. In 1957 Jan Brouwer won a competition for a new design of the spire, and Brouwer's design, entitled De Prediker (The Ecclesiastes), was built. The tower is crowned by a statue of Christ surrounded by angels and tuning forks around the bells. Parts of Cuypers' design, as well as the 14th-century tower, are still visible. The spire consists of eight freestanding outer columns and eight slightly shorter inner columns. The outer columns are about 14 meters high. A bundle of twelve steel wires runs from top to bottom. The inner columns are interconnected with bronze bridge bars from which the bells of the carillon are hung. Sculptor Willem Reijers made the concrete angel statues approximately eight meters high which crowns the tower together with a bronze cross.

== Carillon ==
In 1670 Pieter Hemony, who was a bell-founder in Amsterdam at the time, supplied a chimes for the tower, which was to be destroyed by fire in 1876. Space had been reserved for a carillon in Pierre Cuypers' tower, but it never happened to install a new carillon in this tower. After the Second World War, a new carillon was purchased which was cast in 1958 by Petit & Fritsen. It consists of 36 bells with the size: A1 (470 kg) -b1-chromatic-a4 Connected to the keyboard as C2-d2-chrom.-c5.

== Organ ==
The organ from the Basilica of Saint Willibrord was built in the years 1610–1612 by the French-Flemish organ builder Loys Isoré.

Isoré worked in Antwerp at the time. He built a single manual instrument with 13 voices and a 'short octave' for the main church. In 1685 the Flemish Frederik Noblo carried out extensive repairs to the wind supply, pipework and mechanics.

In the course of the eighteenth century, repairs were carried out by the Antwerp organ builder Moreau. Painter Johan Baltisberger renovated the paintings on the organ shutters. A plan to expand the organ with a Rugwerk was not implemented.

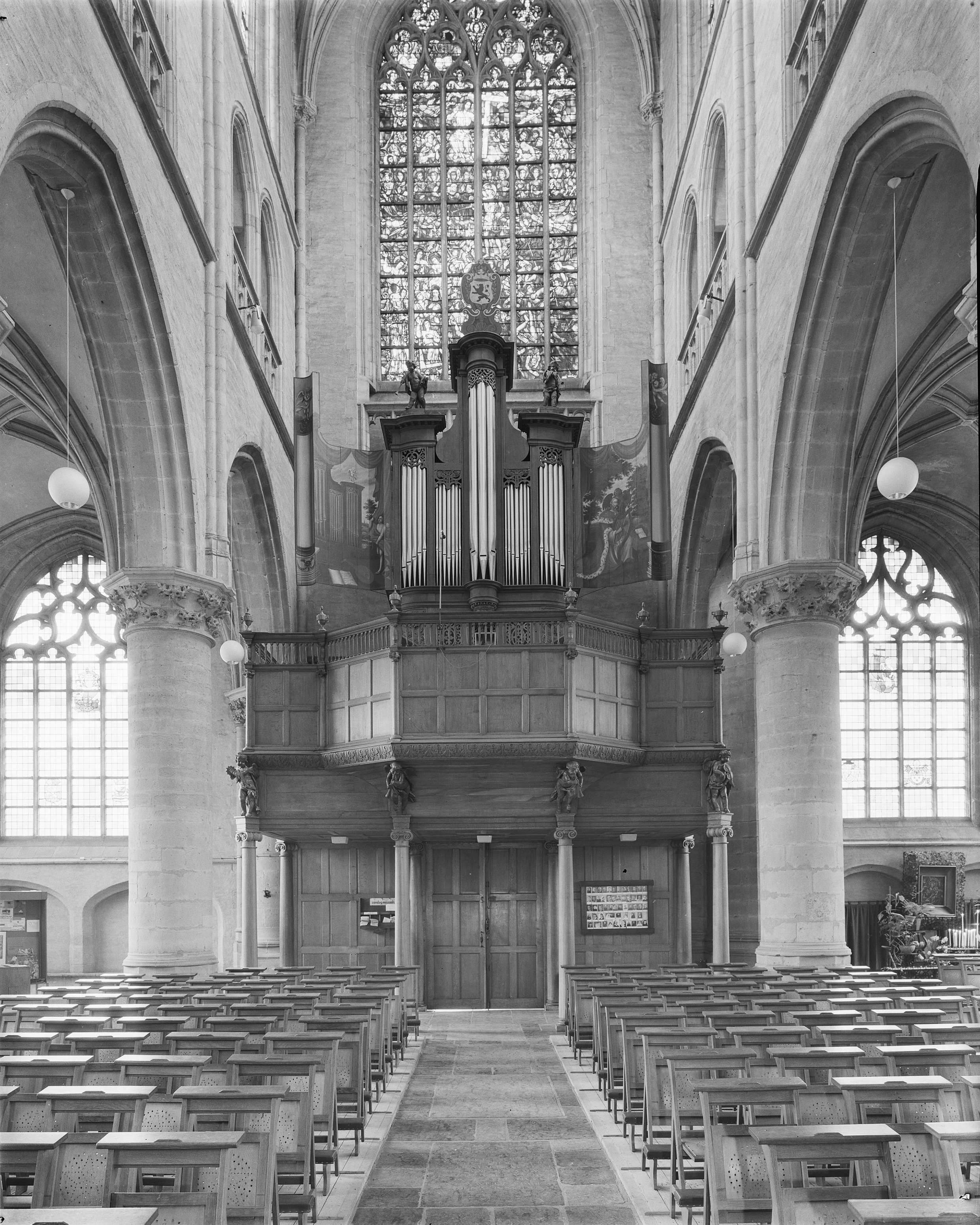
Organ in the west of the basilica

In 1764, Louis Delhaye from Antwerp was commissioned to make new wind chests and to place most of the old pipes on them, supplemented with the new registers Prestant 8 'and Sesquialter. There also had to be a third in the Cornet. A radical change awaited from 1929. Then the organ's pipes, mechanics and bellows were merged with a smaller, similar organ used in the choir church. On a wind chest from Cavaillé-Coll (bought in 1874) above the sacristy, the two organs were brought together to form an electropneumatic instrument.

Under the leadership of adviser Hans van der Harst, the organ was restored and reconstructed in 1970/71 by the company Flentrop (Zaandam). She expanded the organ with a breastwork and free pedal. The Cavaillé-Coll wind chest was removed and moved to Haarlem. Of the 14 original registers, 11 could be wholly or partially preserved. In the breastwork (Positief) old Flemish pipes could be used in the Doublette 2 '. The result of this restoration and new construction is an organ of a completely southern character. In 1989 the organ was overhauled again with a cleaning and re-intonation. The Regaal 16 'was converted into an 8-foot register. This latest restoration has contributed to the organ being further expanded and the authenticity of the sound to come into its own even better. In 2012 Flentrop Orgelbouw started implementing a five-year maintenance plan. Repair work, re-intonation and cleaning of greenhouses and pipework were on the program.

Today the organ is an artistic showpiece of the French-Flemish organ building style in the Netherlands.

== Restoration ==
The basilica was restored between 1996 and 1999. The planning for this started in 1987. Six and a half tons of natural stone was impregnated with concrete and old Balegem sandstone replaced by natural stone from the Czech Republic (trachyte). Over 3000 m^{2} of new slates were placed on the roof, new pinnacles and all stained-glass windows were renewed. In total, the restorers used more than 10,000 kg of lead.

== Bibliography ==
- Ozinga e.a.,M.D.: De Gotische kerkelijke bouwkunst, Amsterdam, Uitgeverij Contact, 1953.
- Kluiver, JH: Historical organs in Zeeland, Middelburg 1976
- Loosjes, Mr. A - De Torenmuziek der Nederlanden uitgave 1916 door Scheltema en Holkema boekhandel Amsterdam.
- Lehr, André - Historische en muzikale aspecten van Hemony-beiaarden (Amsterdam 1960).
- Lehr, André - De Klokkengieters François en Pieter Hemony Uitgave B. Eijsbouts C.V. Asten in het Hemonyjaar 1959.
- de Jong, Rinus; Lehr, André; de Waard, Romke - De zingende torens van Nederland - Losbladige uitgave der Nederlandse Klokkenspel Vereniging rond 1980.
- Lehr, André - Besemer J.W.C - Zingende Torens Gelderland & Limburg. De Walburgpers CIP/ISBN 906011-705-0
- Lehr André: De klokkengieters François en Pieter Hemony (Asten, 1959)
- Lehr André Artikel over Gebr. Hemony PDF
- Lehr André: Van Paardebel tot Speelklok, uitgave Europese Bibliotheek Zaltbommel 1971 (geen ISBN)
- Rombouts Luc: Zingend Brons, uitgeverij Davidsfonds Leuven, 2010, ISBN 978-90-5826-720-7
- Weel Heleen van der: Klokkenspel Het carillon en zijn bespelers tot 1800, Uitgeverij Verloren Hilversum 2008, ISBN 978-90-8704-061-1
