= Sint-Lievensmonstertoren =

Tower in Zierikzee, the Netherlands

Coordinates: 51°39′1″N 3°54′52″E

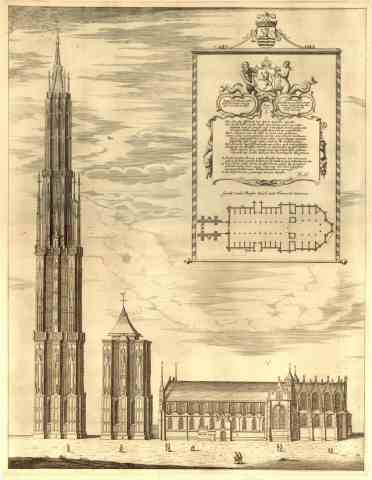
1657 drawing of the St.-Lievensmonstertoren; planned version on the left, actual tower in the middle, and the accompanying church (burned down in 1832) on the right, with the plan at the top right

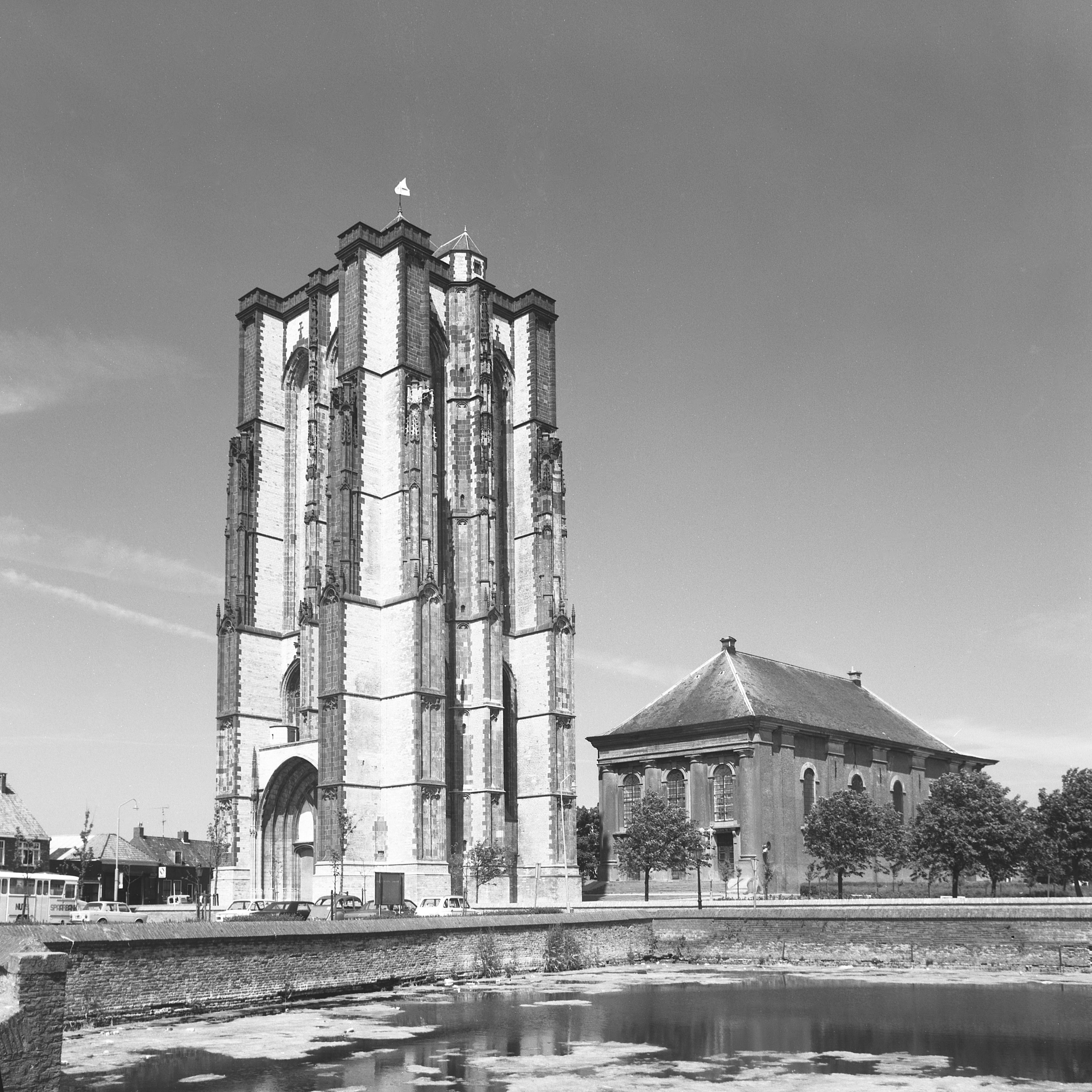
1975 photograph of the current tower, with the later "Nieuwe Kerk" ("New Church") to the right

The Sint-Lievensmonstertoren (English: Saint-Livinus Monster Tower), also known as the Dikke Toren (or Fat Tower) is a 62 metre tall, unfinished, free standing church tower in Zierikzee, Netherlands. The accompanying church was destroyed by a fire in 1832.

In 1454 work started on a church tower, designed by Andries I Keldermans in the Brabantine Gothic style. It was planned to be, according to different sources, either 130 metres or 204 metres tall (the latter would have made it the tallest church tower in the world by far). The work was continued by his relatives Antoon I Keldermans and Rombout II Keldermans. Work on the tower halted in 1530, when the city went through a financial crisis. The tower is now 62 metres tall, on a base of 24.5 metres by 24.5 metres. Since 1881, it is a property of the state, and it has been designated a Rijksmonument. The name doesn't refer to monsters, but to a minster.
