= Brabantine Gothic =

Variant of Gothic architecture that is typical for the Low Countries

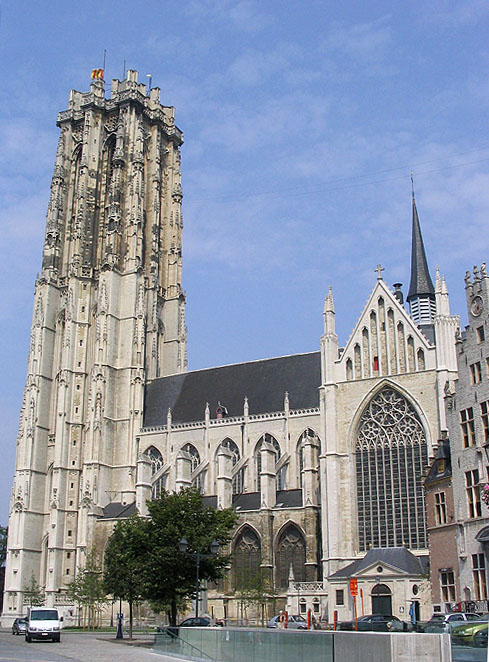
St. Rumbold's Cathedral in Mechelen

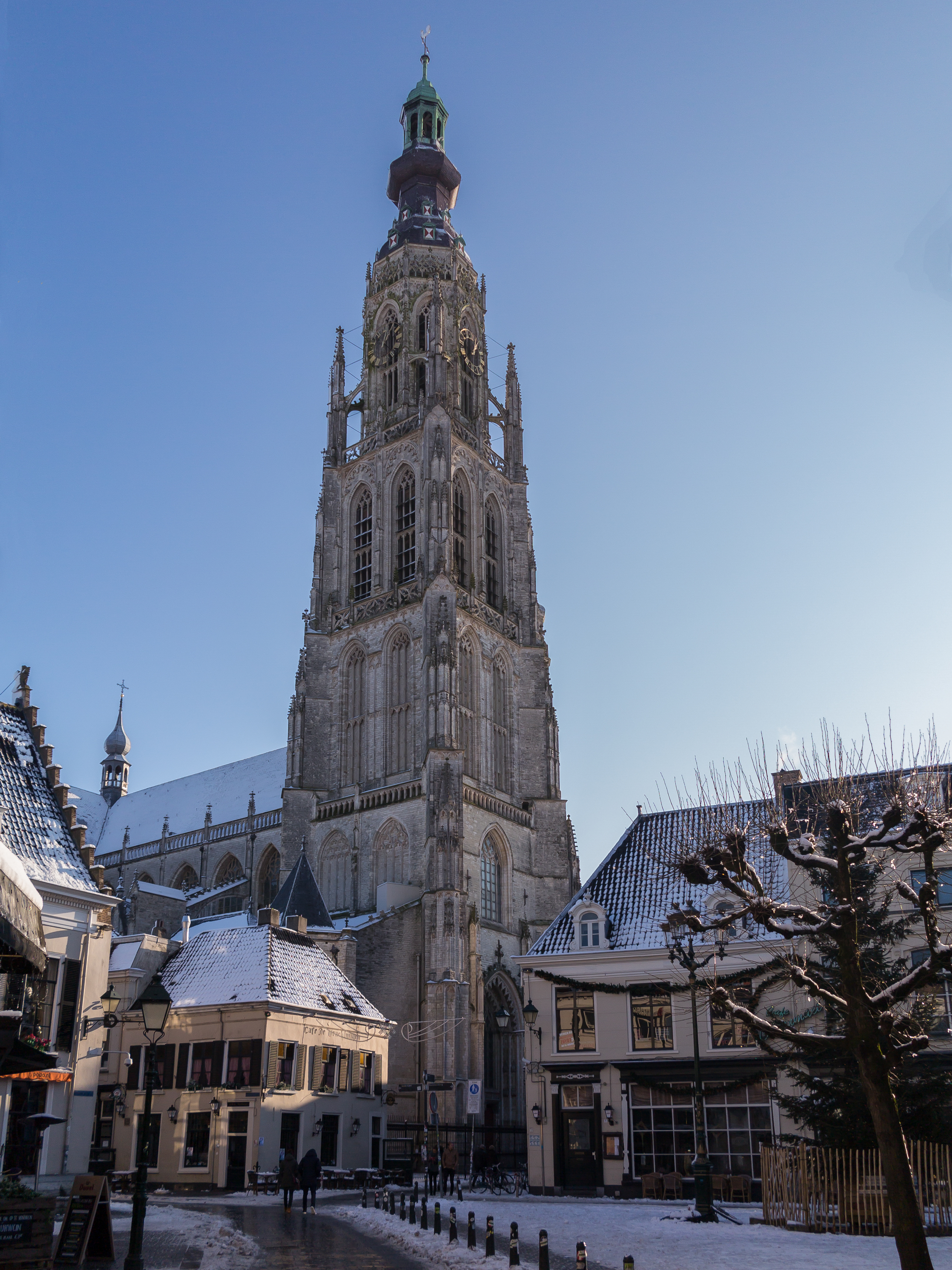
The Church of Our Lady in Breda

Brabantine Gothic, occasionally called Brabantian Gothic, is a significant variant of Gothic architecture that is typical for the Low Countries. It surfaced in the first half of the 14th century at St. Rumbold's Cathedral in the city of Mechelen. (Note: The earliest Brabantine Gothic style elements were built soon after 1333 when the Prince-Bishop of Liège passed his feudal claim on Mechelen, in particular through its cathedral chapter, to Louis II, Count of Flanders, who married the heiress of Brabant and in 1355 took the title of Duke of Brabant.)

Reputed architects such as Jean d'Oisy, Jacob van Thienen, Everaert Spoorwater, Matheus de Layens, and the Keldermans and De Waghemakere families disseminated the style and techniques to cities and towns of the Duchy of Brabant and beyond. (Note: About Gothic architecture in the Low Countries, the Dutch-language term kustgotiek ('Coastal Gothic') occurs. Apparently, that literature describes its present-day national coastal areas: in the Netherlands mainly the subject found in this WP article under Counties of Holland and of Zeeland; in Belgium (including topics about Zeelandic Flanders) mainly (a variant of) Scheldt Gothic. Mostly fifteenth-century constructions, Gothic churches in the former Duchy of Guelders are Lower Rhine Gothic, following a style from the area along the Lower Rhine in present-day Germany.) For churches and other major buildings, the tenor prevailed and lasted throughout the Renaissance.

== Harbingers ==
Brabantine Gothic, in a Low Countries context also referred to as High Gothic, differs from the earlier introduced Scheldt Gothic, which typically had the main tower above the crossing of a church, maintained Romanesque horizontal lines, and applied blue-gray stone quarried from the vicinity of Tournai at the river Scheldt that allowed its transportation in particular in the old County of Flanders.

Mosan Gothic (Meuse Gothic) refers to the river Maas (or Meuse, borrowed from French), mainly in the south-eastern parts of the Low Countries: the modern provinces of Limburg in the Netherlands, Limburg, and Liège in Belgium. Though of a later origin than Scheldt Gothic, it also still showed more Romanesque features, including smaller windows. Marlstone was used, and around the capitals on limestone columns are sculptured leaves of irises.

== Characteristics ==
=== Two centuries of Brabantine Gothic design ===
Surface conditions and available materials varied. Larger churches could take centuries of building during which expertise and fashions caused successive architects to evolve further from the original plans. Or, Romanesque churches became rebuilt in phases of dismantling and replacing, as (apart from its crypt) St. Bavo's Cathedral in Ghent: the early 14th-century chancel is influenced by northern French and Scheldt Gothic, a century later a radiating chapel appeared, and between 1462 and 1538 the mature Brabantine Gothic west tower was erected; the nave was then still to be finished. Though few buildings are of an entirely consistent style, the ingenuity and craftsmanship of architects could realize a harmonious blend. The ultimate concepts were drawn centuries after the earliest designs. It follows that Brabantine Gothic style is neither homogeneous, nor strictly defined. (Note: Because in many cases, a building shows characteristics of several styles, it may be more accurate to use predicates like 'Gothic' for elements instead of for the entire building. Nevertheless, it is customary to categorize a building by its mainly perceived style, or occasionally by its most noteworthy features. A Gothic building may have been constructed or rebuilt well after the typical period. E.g., apart from one gallery and the ground floor by Rombout II Keldermans, the edifice designed as seat of the Great Council of the Netherlands at Mechelen finally got built following his drawings in the early 20th century, and became a 'new' wing of the City Hall.)

=== Features ===
The Brabantine Gothic style originated with the advent of the Duchy of Brabant and spread across the Burgundian Netherlands. Besides minor influences by the High Cathedral of St. Peter and St. Mary in Cologne, the architecture builds on the classic French Gothic style as practiced in the construction of cathedrals such as those in Amiens and Reims.

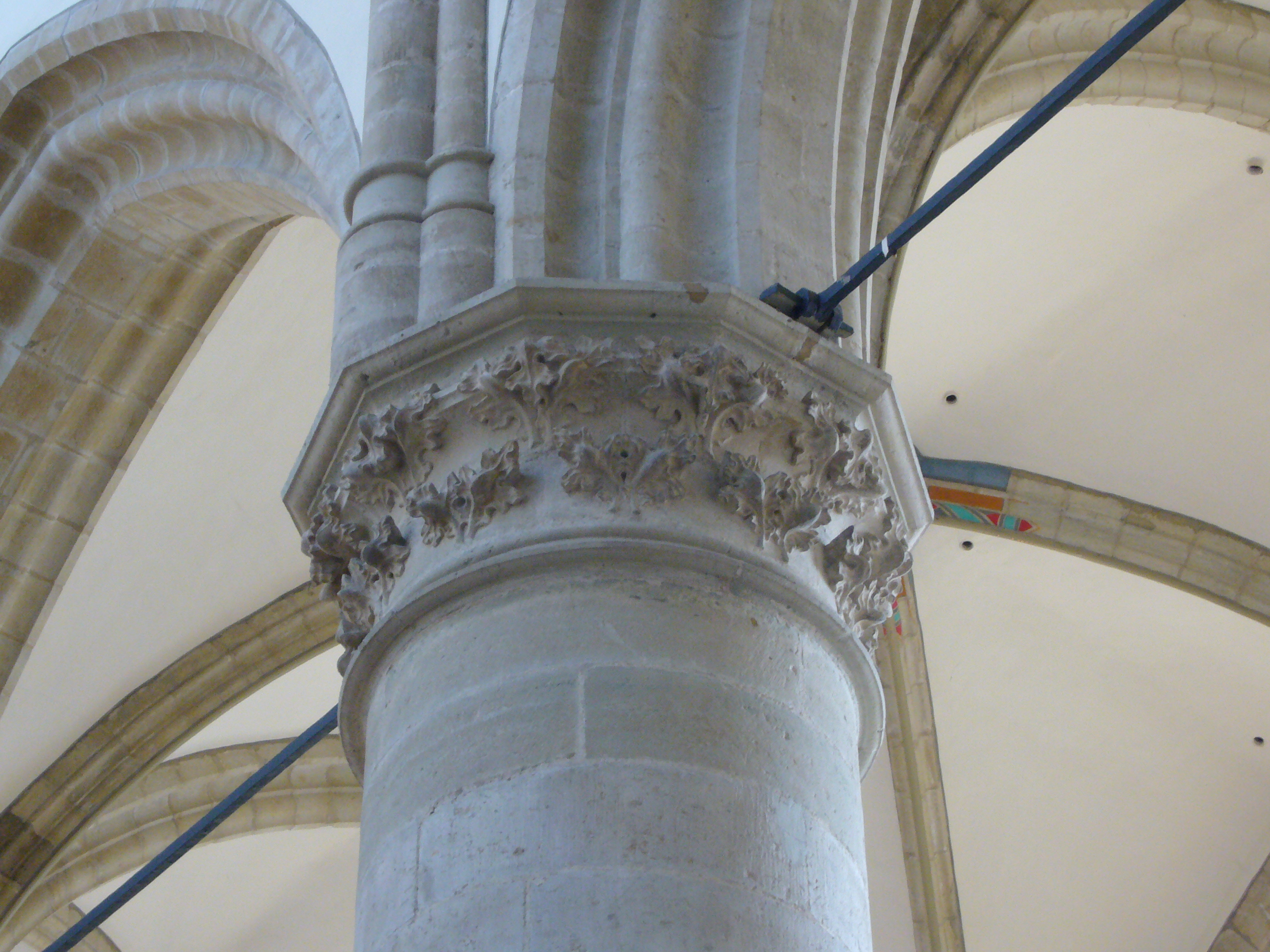
Decorated capital at round column of the nave in the Grote Kerk in Dordrecht

The structure of the church buildings in Brabant was largely the same: a large-scale cruciform floor plan with three-tier elevation along the nave and side aisles (pier arches, triforium, clerestory) and a choir backed by a half-round ambulatory. The slender tallness of the French naves however, was never surpassed, and the size tended to be slightly more modest.

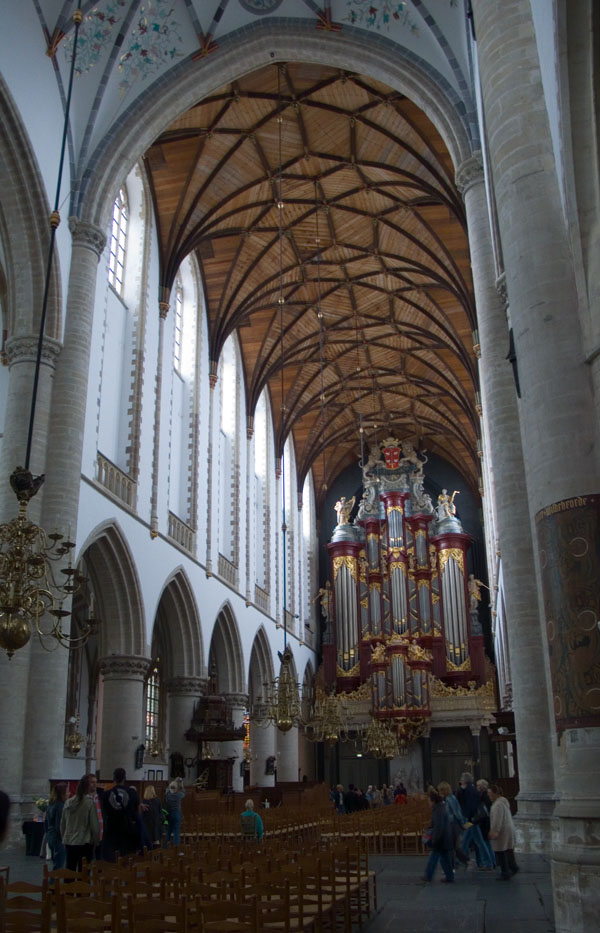
Brabantine round columns with cabbage leaf capitals, Hollandic use of wood for vaults in the Grote Kerk in Haarlem

It is characterized by using light-coloured sandstone or limestone, which allowed rich detailing but is erosion-prone. The churches typically have round columns with cabbage foliage sculpted capitals. From there half-pillar buttresses continue often without interruption into the vault ribs. The triforium and the windows of the clerestory generally continue into one another, with the windows taking the entire space of the pointed arch. An ambulatory with radiating chapels (chevet) is part of the design (though at the 15th-century choir in Breda added later on). Whereas the cathedrals in Brussels and Antwerp are notable exceptions, the main porch is straight under the single west tower, in French called clocher-porche.

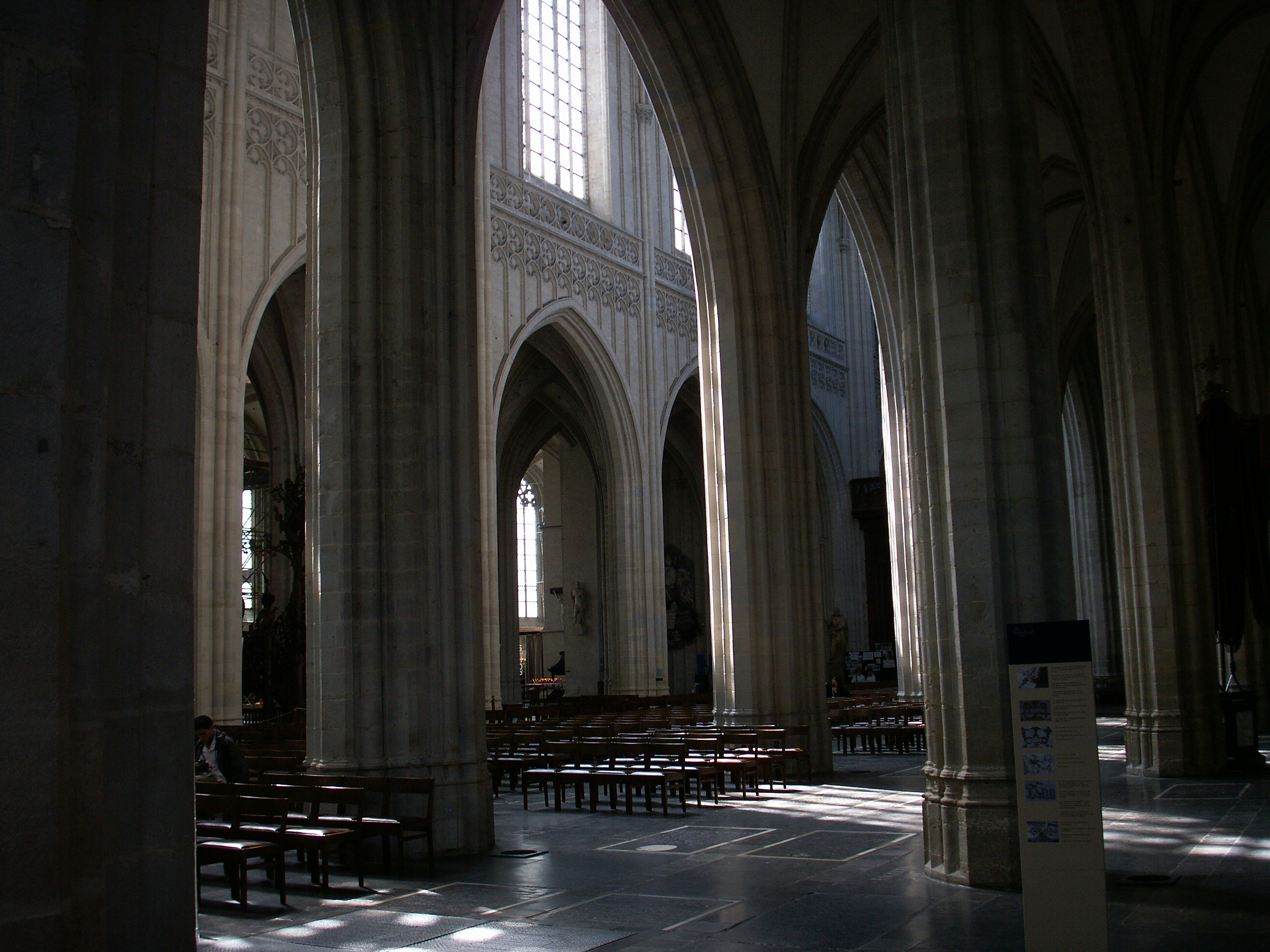
Pillar bundle columns (on this side), and frieze of tracery (underneath windows), in the Cathedral of Our Lady in Antwerp

An alternative type originated with the cathedral of Antwerp: instead of round columns with a capital impost, bundled pillars profiled in the columns continue without interruption through the ribs of vaults and arches – a style followed for churches in 's-Hertogenbosch and Leuven. In addition, the pier arches between nave and aisles are exceptionally wide, and the triforium is omitted. Instead, a transom of tracery is placed above the pier arches. This type was followed by other major churches in Antwerp, St. Martin Church in Aalst, and St. Michael's Church in Ghent.

Demer Gothic in the Hageland and Campine Gothic are regional variants of Brabantine Gothic in the south-eastern part of the former duchy. (Note: The Duchy of Brabant included the area around the city of Halen, a western tip of the present-day circumscription of the Province of Limburg of the Flemish Region.) Those styles can be distinguished merely by the use of local rust-brown bricks. (Note: Sources mention the west tower's sturdiness as a typical Campine Gothic characteristic. Other sources however, note this feature for Brabantine Gothic as a whole.)

Brabantine Gothic city halls are built in the shape of gigantic box reliquaries with corner turrets and usually a belfry. The exterior is often profusely decorated.

=== Adaptations in Holland and of Zeeland ===
Many churches in the former Counties of Holland and Zeeland are built in a style sometimes inaccurately separated as Hollandic and as Zeelandic Gothic. These are in fact Brabantine Gothic style buildings with concessions necessitated by local conditions. Thus (except for Dordrecht), because of the soggy ground, weight was saved by wooden barrel vaults instead of stone vaults and the flying buttresses required for those. In most cases, the walls were made of bricks but cut natural stone was not unusual.

Everaert Spoorwater played an important role in spreading Brabantine Gothic into Holland and Zeeland. He perfected a method by which the drawings for large constructions allowed ordering virtually all natural stone elements from quarries on later Belgian territory, then at the destination needing merely their cementing in place. This eliminated storage near the construction site, and the work could be done without the permanent presence of the architect.

== Renowned examples of Brabantine Gothic architecture ==
=== In the former Duchy of Brabant ===
(Note: Buildings within a named area's outer boundaries are listed, regardless whether the ruler of that area controlled a particular city therein.)

==== Ecclesiastical buildings ====
In order of the year mentioned for their earliest Brabantine Gothic style characteristics

- St. Rumbold's Cathedral in Mechelen, early Gothic building started around 1200 and consecrated 1312, its first clearly Brabantine Gothic features: ambulatory and 7 radiant chapels from 1335, possibly by Jean d'Oisy
- Church of Our Lady in Aarschot, from 1337 by Jacob Piccart
- St. Martin's Basilica in Halle, from 1341 possibly by Jean d'Oisy
- Collegiate Church of St. Peter and St. Guido in Anderlecht (Brussels), from 1350
- Cathedral of Our Lady in Antwerp, from 1352
- Church of Our Lady-at-the-Pool in Tienen, from 1358 by Jean d'Oisy
- St. John's Cathedral in 's-Hertogenbosch, from about 1370, considered the height of Brabantine Gothic in the present-day Netherlands
- St. Gummarus' Church in Lier, from 1378; the design of the choir is an imitation of that of St. Rumbold's at Mechelen.
- Church of Our Lady-across-the-Dijle in Mechelen, from before 1400
- St. Peter's Church in Leuven, from about 1400
- St. Sulpicius and St. Denis Collegiate Church (colloq. St. Sulpicius Church) in Diest, from before 1402 start for a radiating chapel by the Frenchman Pierre de Savoye - Demer Gothic
- St. Bavo's Cathedral in Ghent, from early 15th century
- Large Church or Church of Our Lady in Breda, from 1410, considered the most pure and elegant Brabantine Gothic in the present-day Netherlands
- Cathedral of St. Michael and St. Gudula in Brussels
- Church of Our Lady of Victories at the Sablon in Brussels
- St. Martin's Church in Aalst
- Gertrudiskerk in Bergen op Zoom
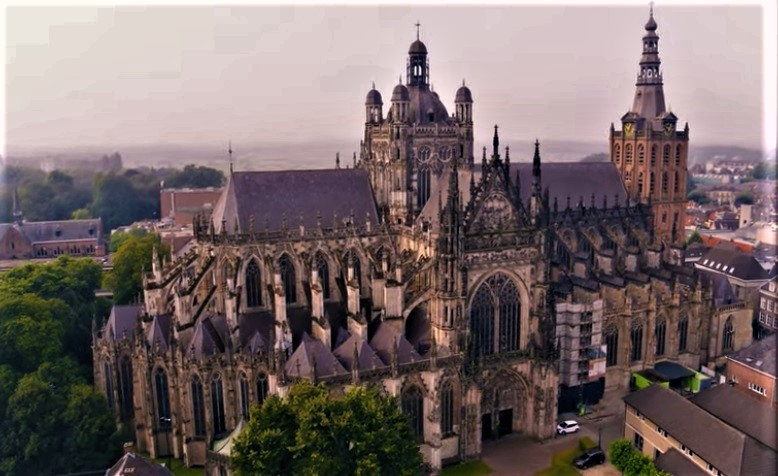
St. John's Cathedral in 's-Hertogenbosch

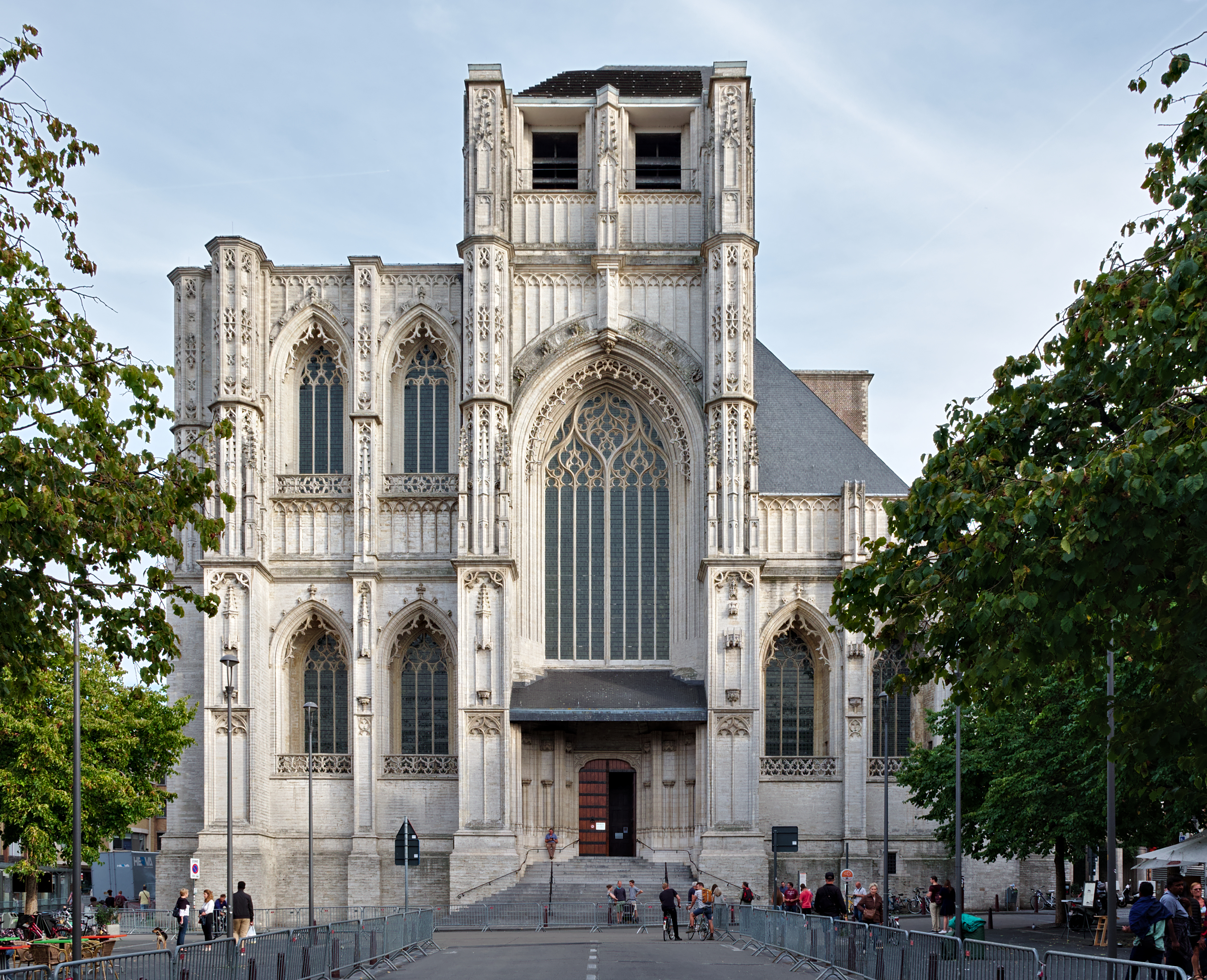
St. Peter's Church in Leuven

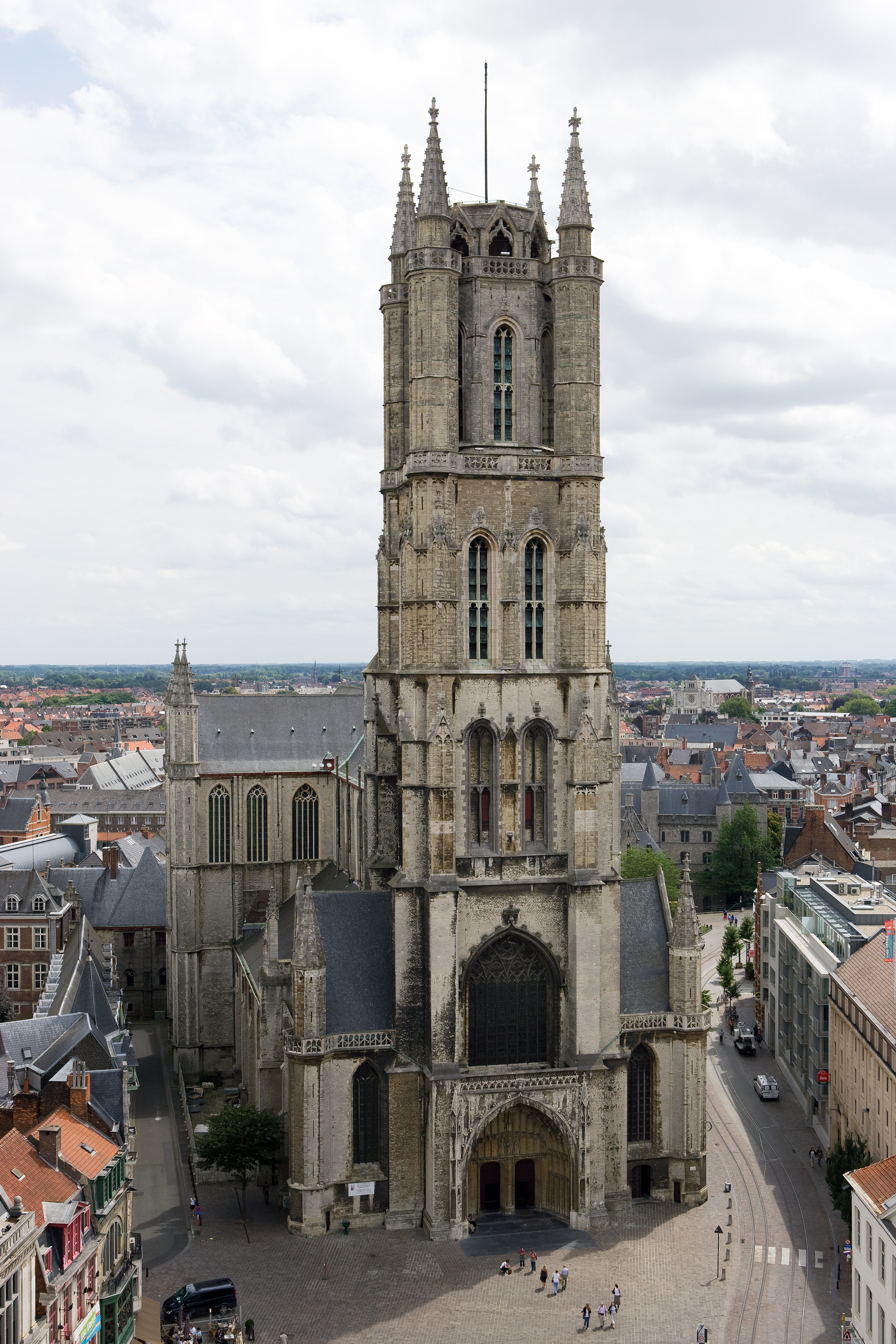
St. Bavo's Cathedral in Ghent

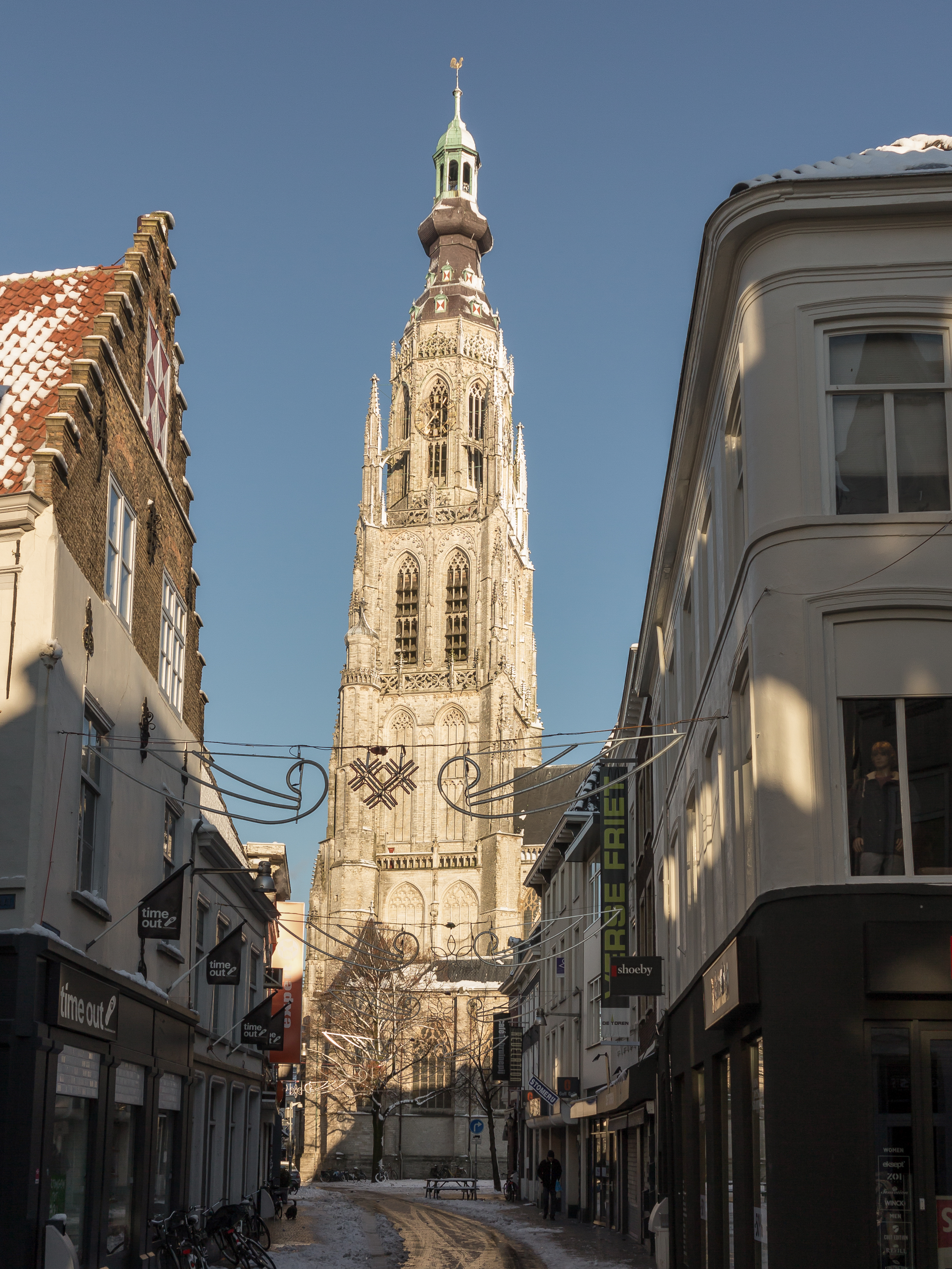
Church of Our Lady in Breda

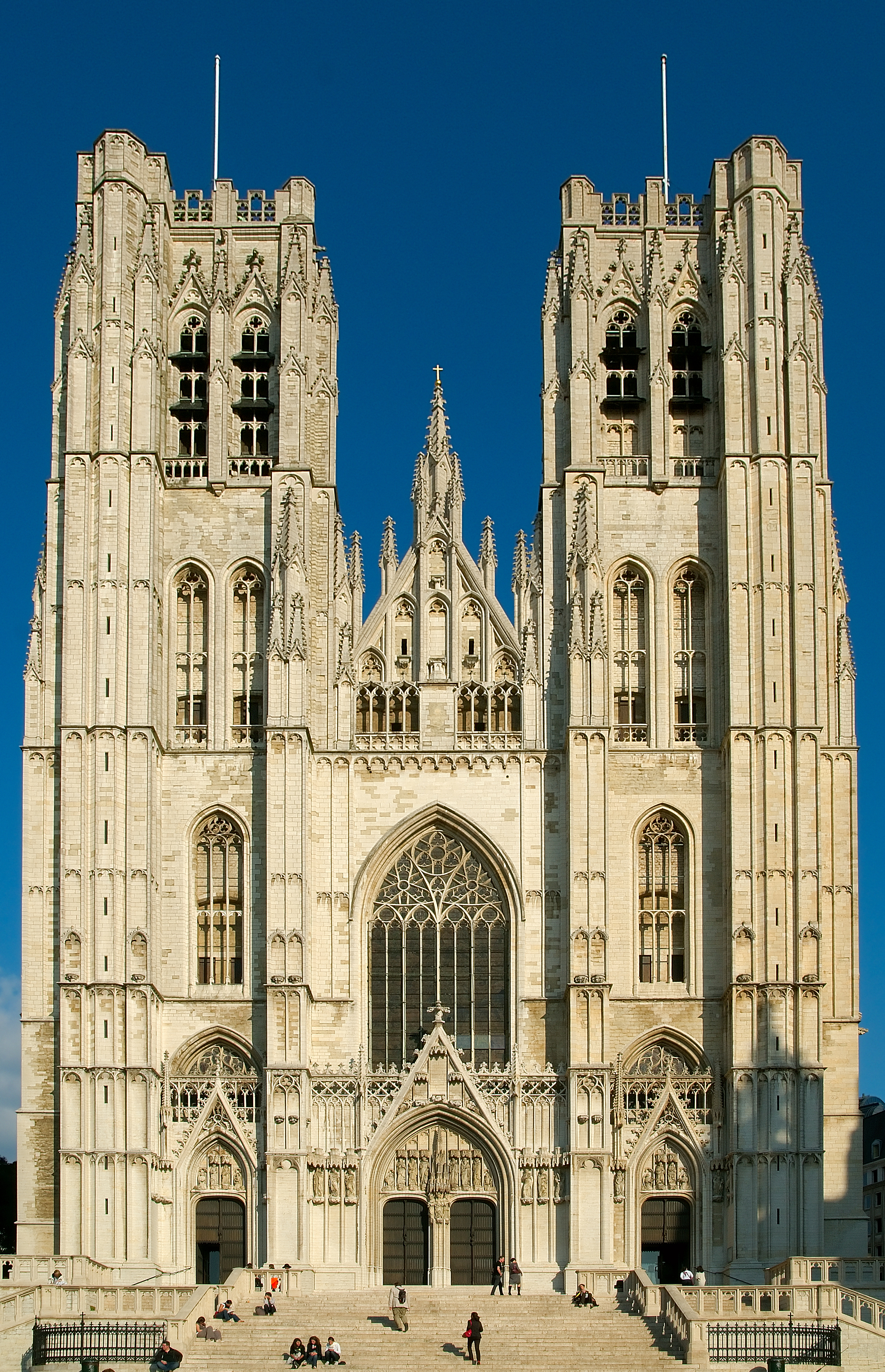
Cathedral of St. Michael and St. Gudula in Brussels

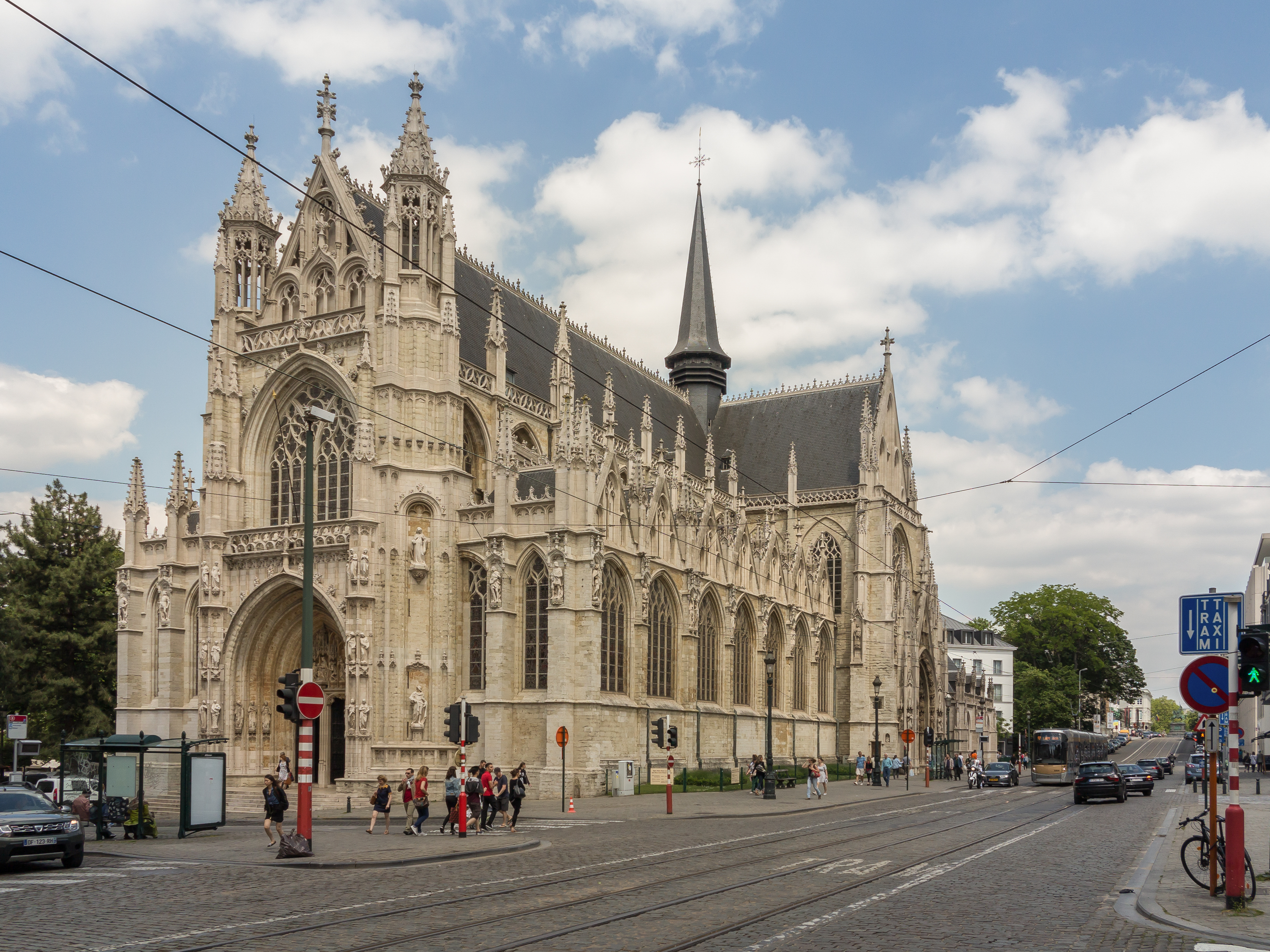
Church of Our Lady of Victories at the Sablon in Brussels

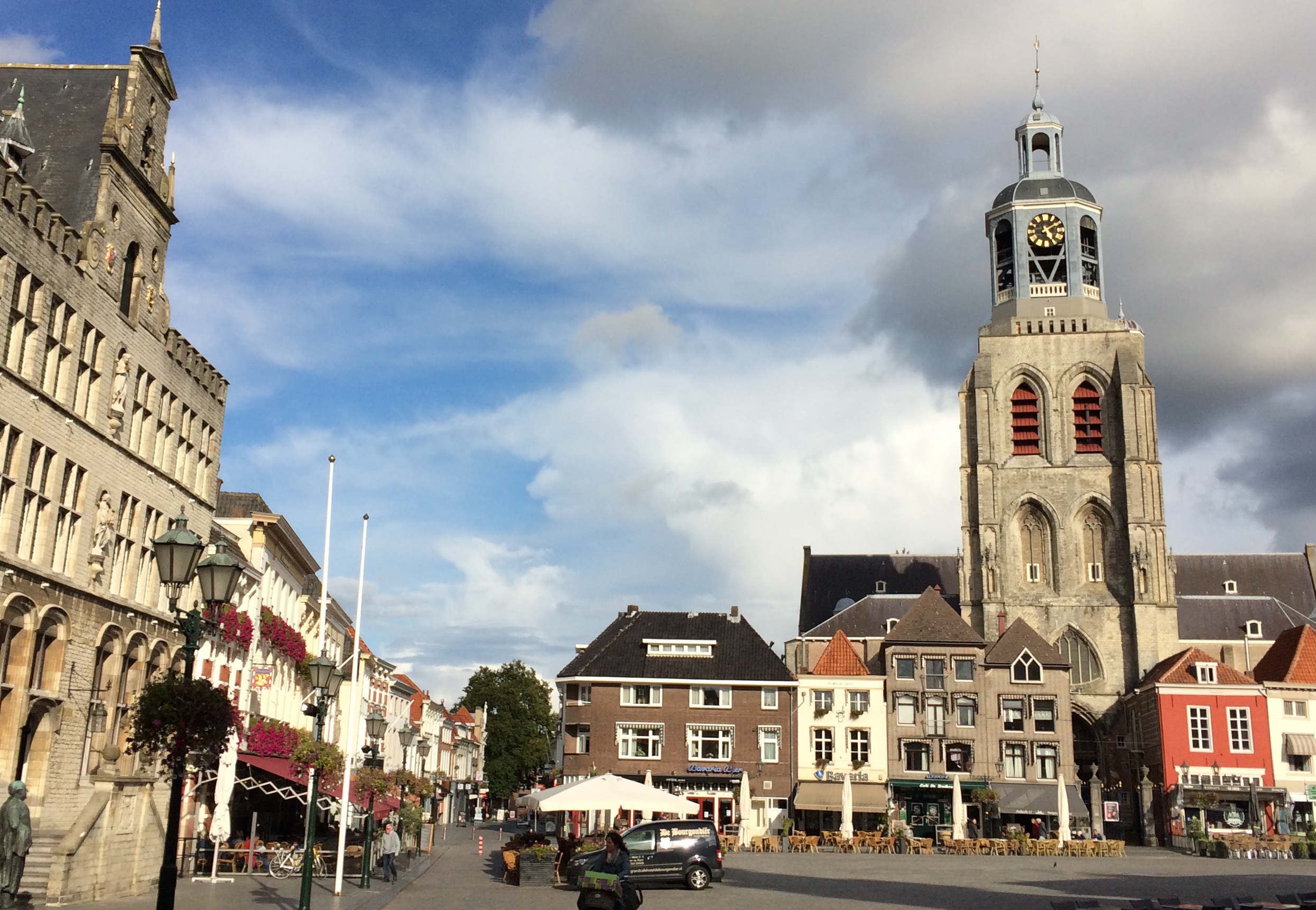
Gertrudiskerk in Bergen op Zoom

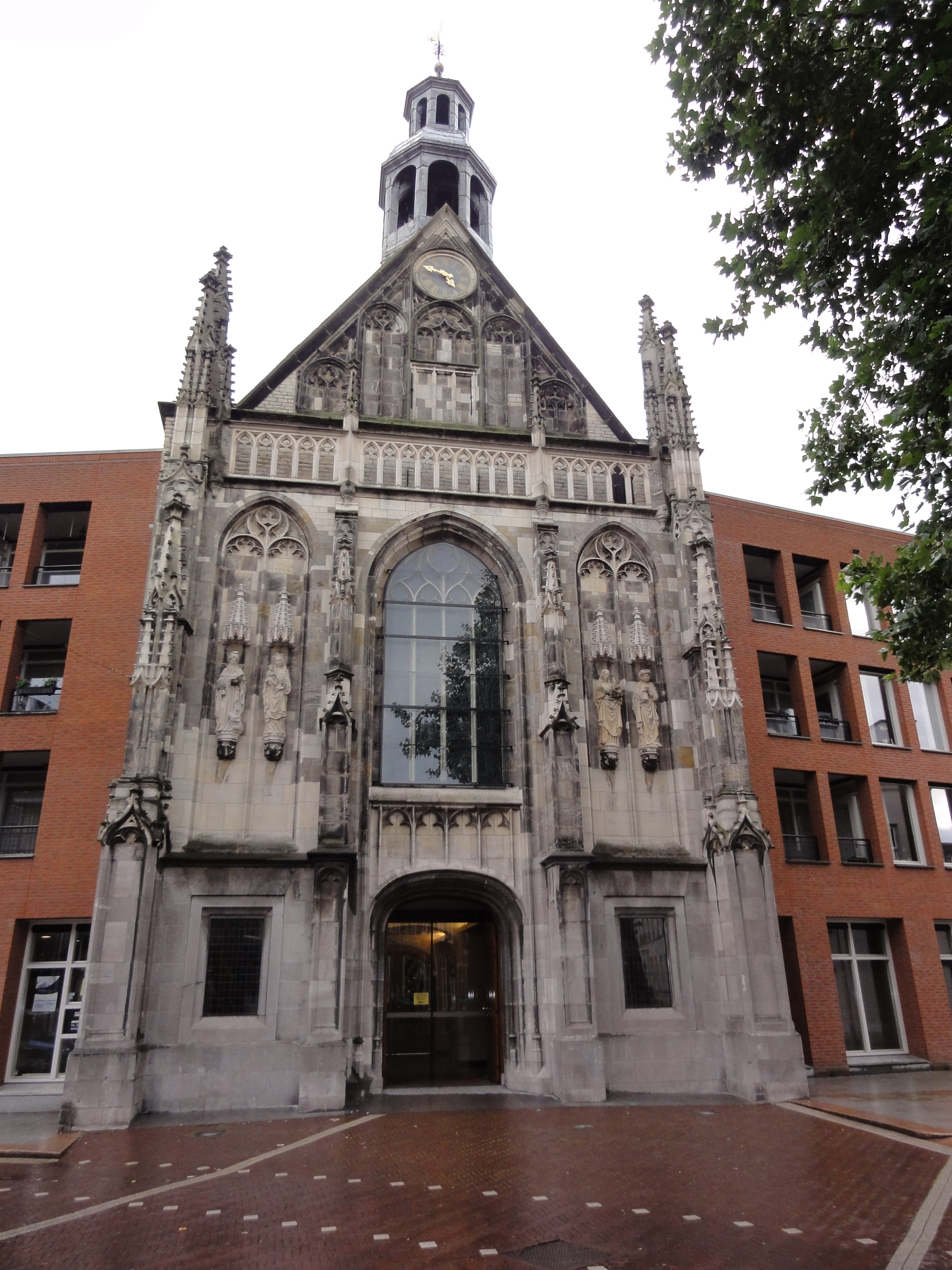
Sint-Antoniuskapel in 's-Hertogenbosch

==== Secular buildings ====
- Brussels' Town Hall
- Leuven's Town Hall
- Margraves' Palace (Dutch: Markiezenhof) in Bergen op Zoom
- Mechelen's Town Hall, north wing (in 1526 designed and partially built, 1900-1911 partially rebuilt and fully completed)
- Oirschot's former Town Hall (Brick building that also housed the Vierschaar, in a minor town: characteristic shrine shape but extremely sober)
- Round Table (Dutch: Tafelrond) in Leuven, 1479 by Matheus de Layens, guildhall built 1480-1487 internally comprising 3 houses, demolished 1817, reconstructed following original plans 1921
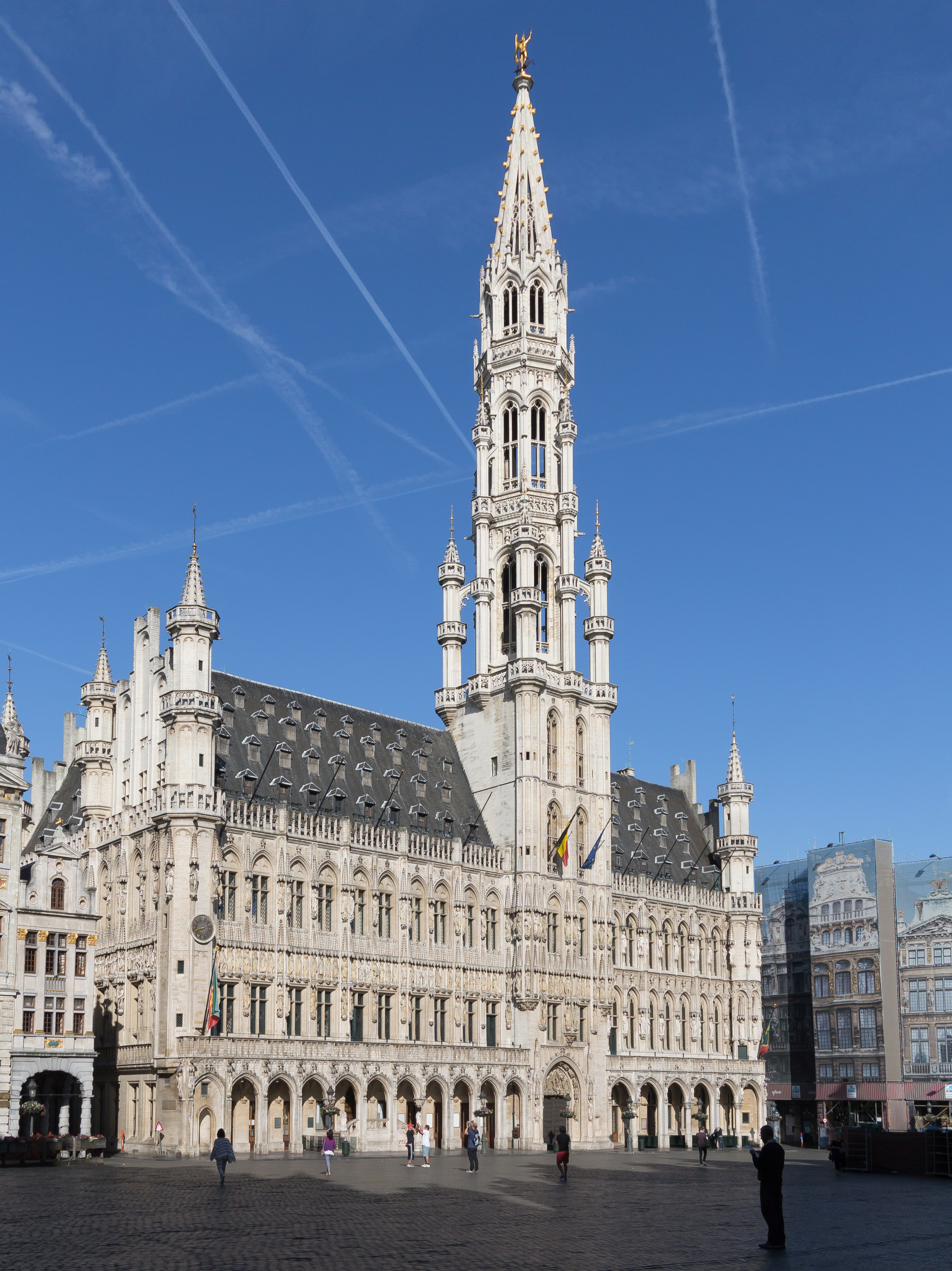
Brussels' Town Hall

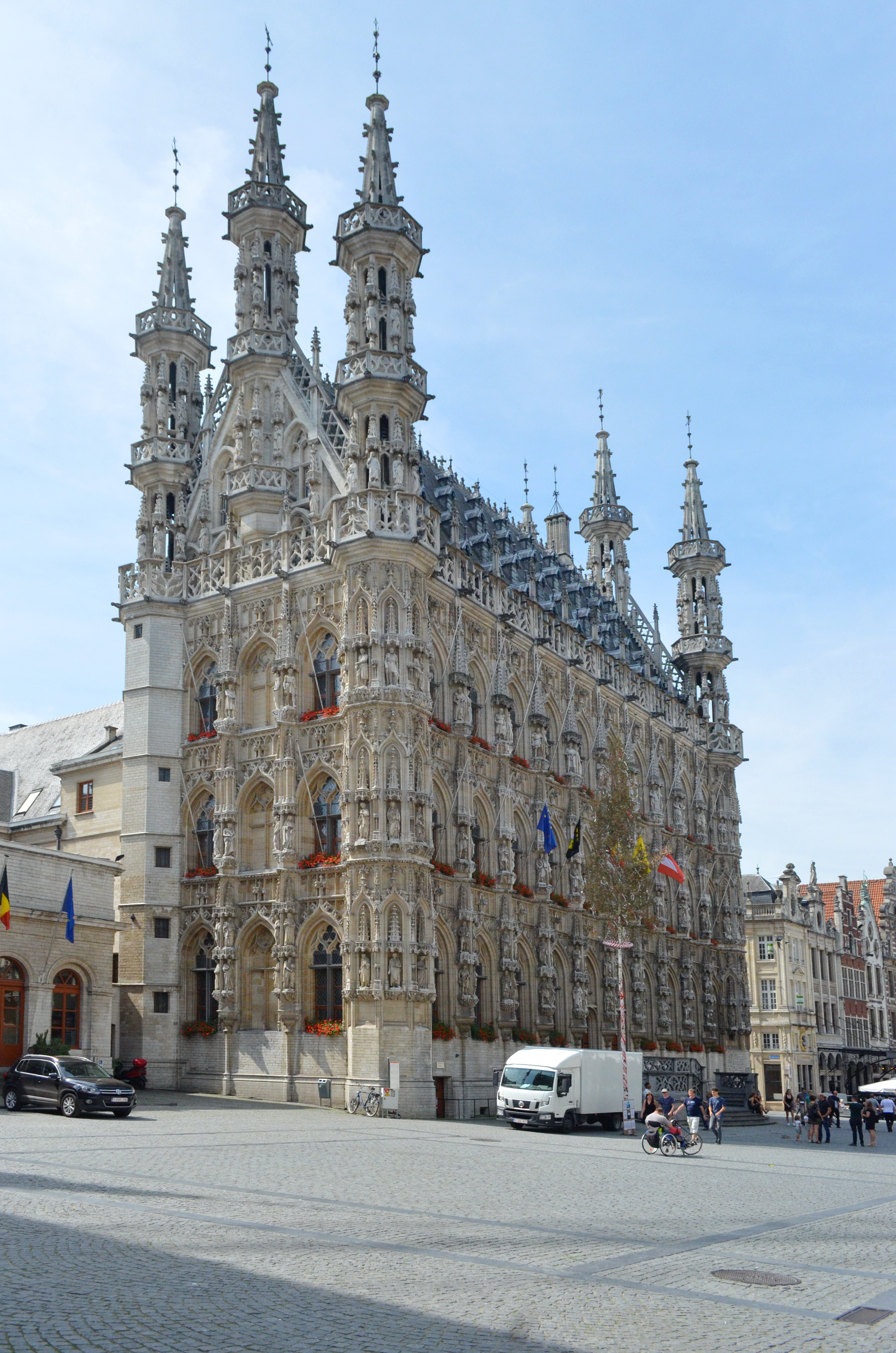
Leuven's Town Hall

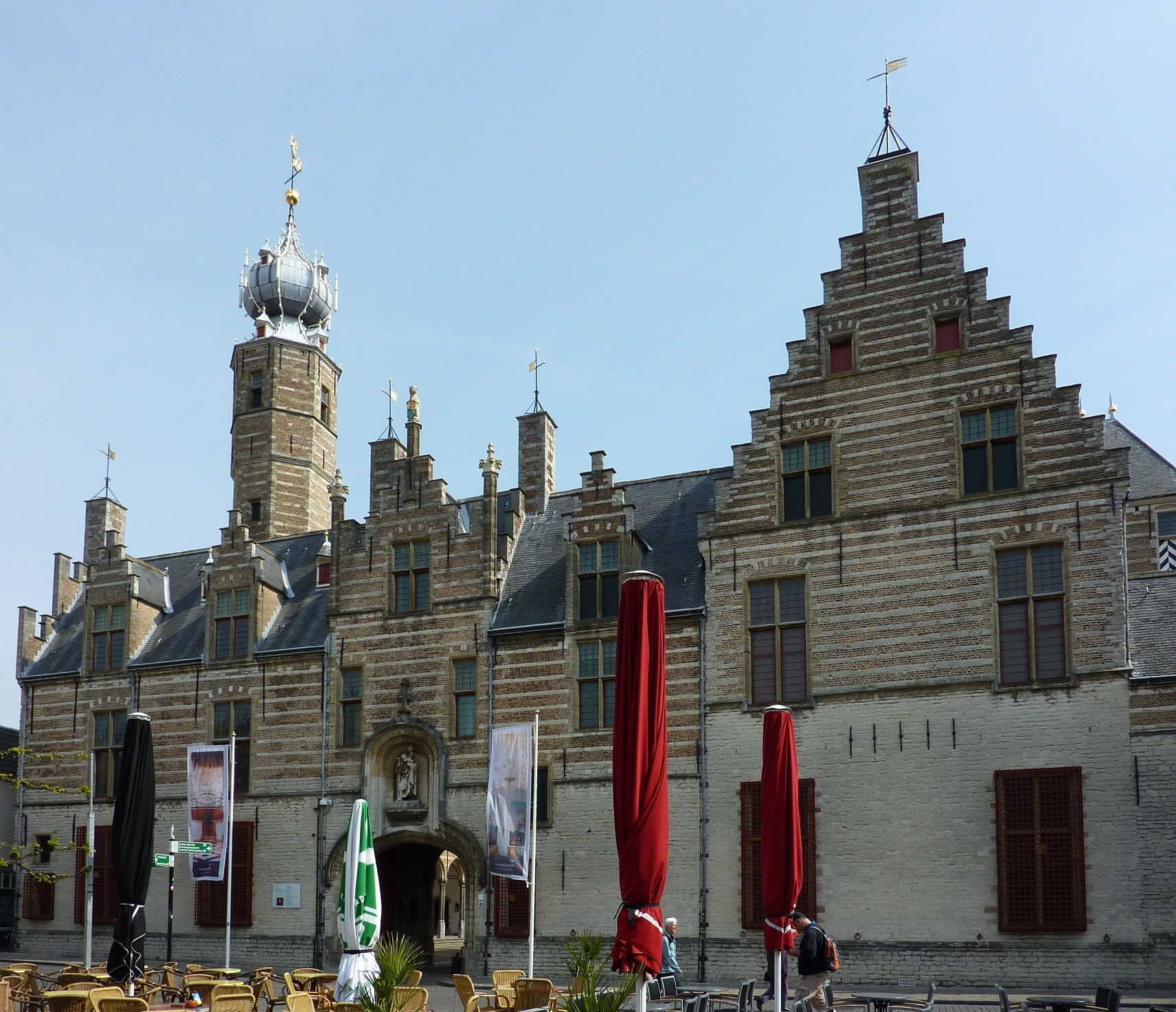
Margraves' Palace in Bergen op Zoom

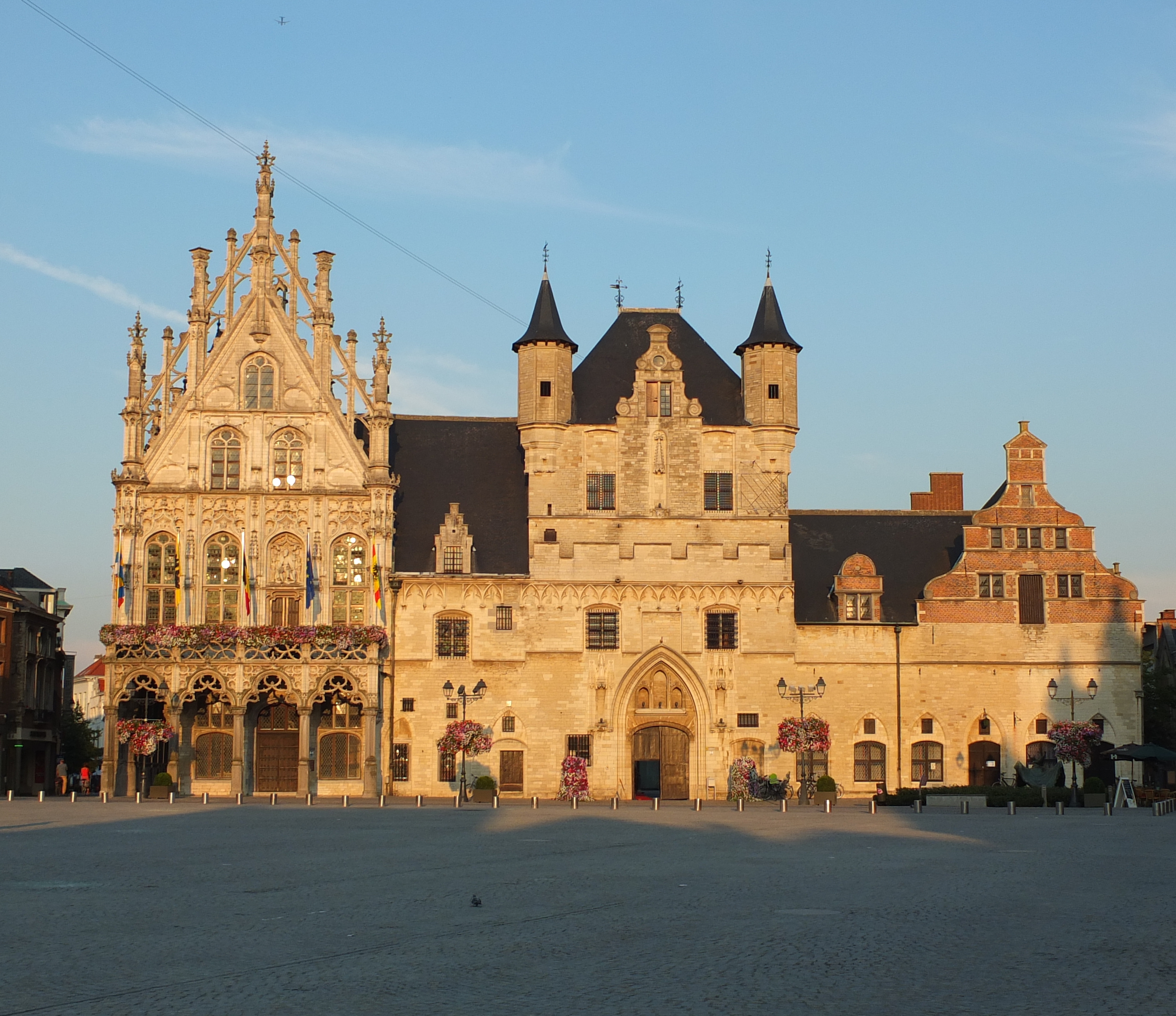
Mechelen's Town Hall

=== In the former Counties of Holland and of Zeeland ===
==== Ecclesiastical buildings ====
- Large Church or Church of Our Lady in Dordrecht (Holland), the present form dates from 1470.
- Large Church or Grote of Sint-Laurenskerk in Alkmaar (Holland)
- Large Church or St. Grote or Sint-Laurenskerk in Rotterdam (Holland)
- Large Church or Grote Kerk in Haarlem (Holland)
- Highland Church or St. Pancras' Church in Leiden (Holland)
- St Willibrordus in Hulst
- Old Church, formerly St. Nicolas' Church, in Amsterdam (largest medieval wooden barrel vault in Europe; wooden spire) (Note: The 'Old Church' in Amsterdam is built with bricks. It shares clear Gothic features with its old hall church character.)
- St. Livinus' Monster Tower (Dutch: St.-Lievensmonstertoren) in Zierikzee (Zeeland) (separated by a gap from the meanwhile demolished church building) (Note: In Mechelen, the very heavy St.Rumbold's tower (now 97 metres high but designed to reach 167, which is 5 metres more than any church tower attains) was being built on earlier wetlands. After a few years, in 1454, its chief architect Andries I Keldermans construed the tower at Zierikzee, where dreaded leaning or sagging of the tower (now 62 metres but designed for ca. 130) could wreck the church. This concern led to fully separated edifices, a solution as applied in Mechelen. At both places, in the early 16th century the upper part of the tower became forsaken, not for technical but for financial reasons. The gap with the cathedral was closed upon finishing the construction. That deliberately weak connection had not been made in Zierikzee when the collegiate church burned down, in 1832.)
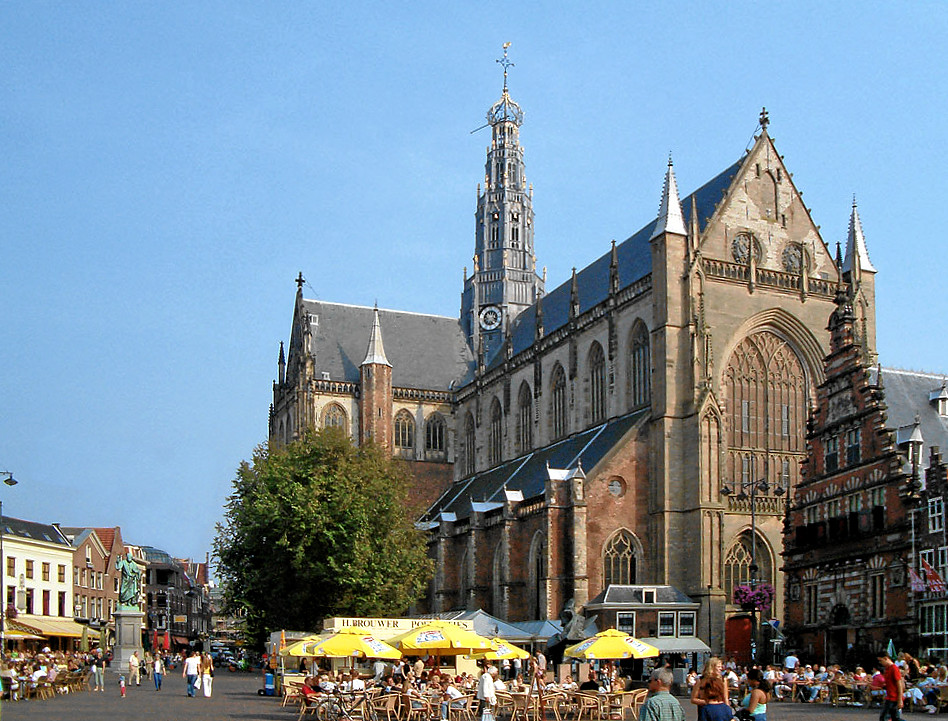
Grote Kerk in Haarlem

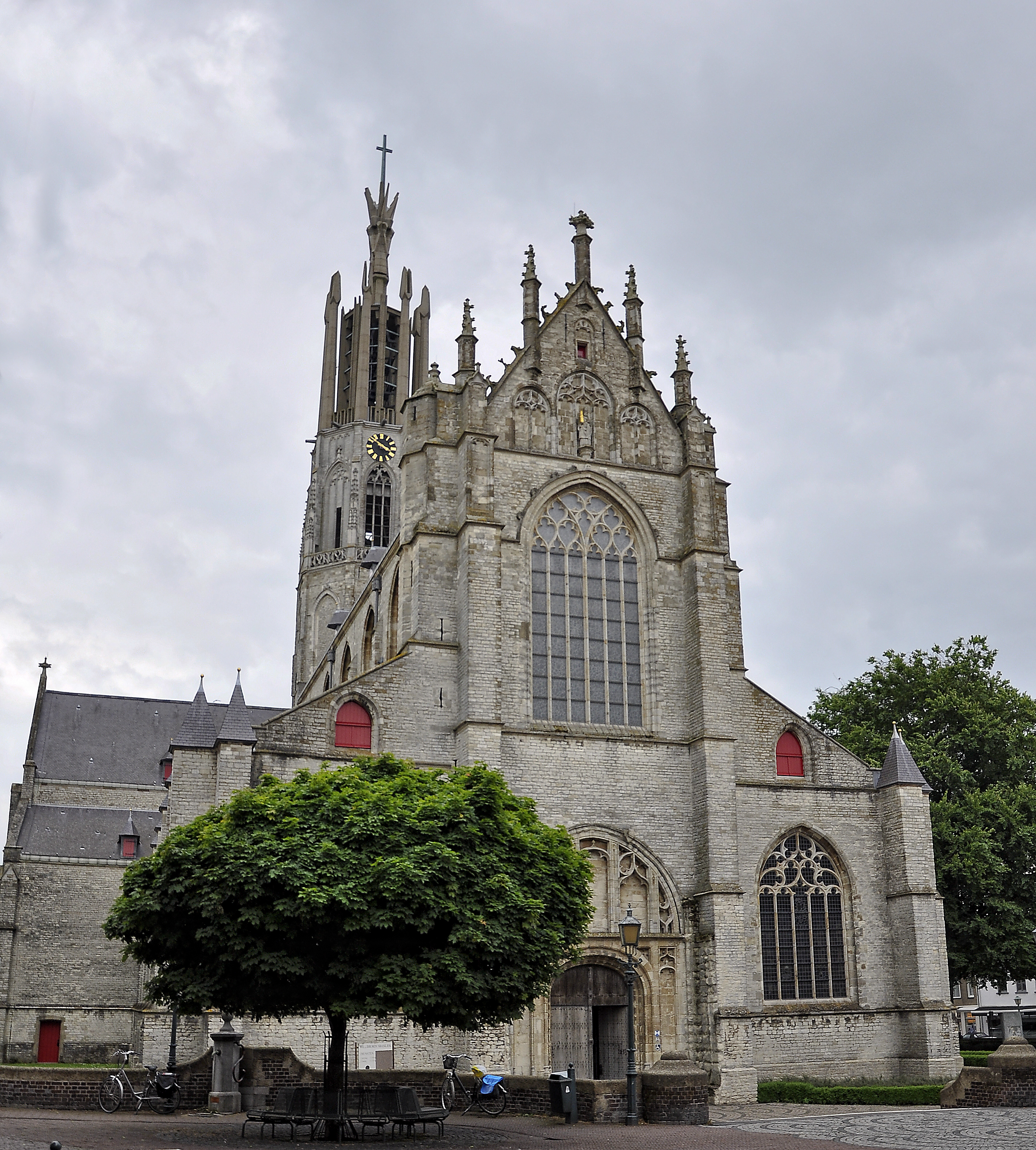
St Willibrordus in Hulst

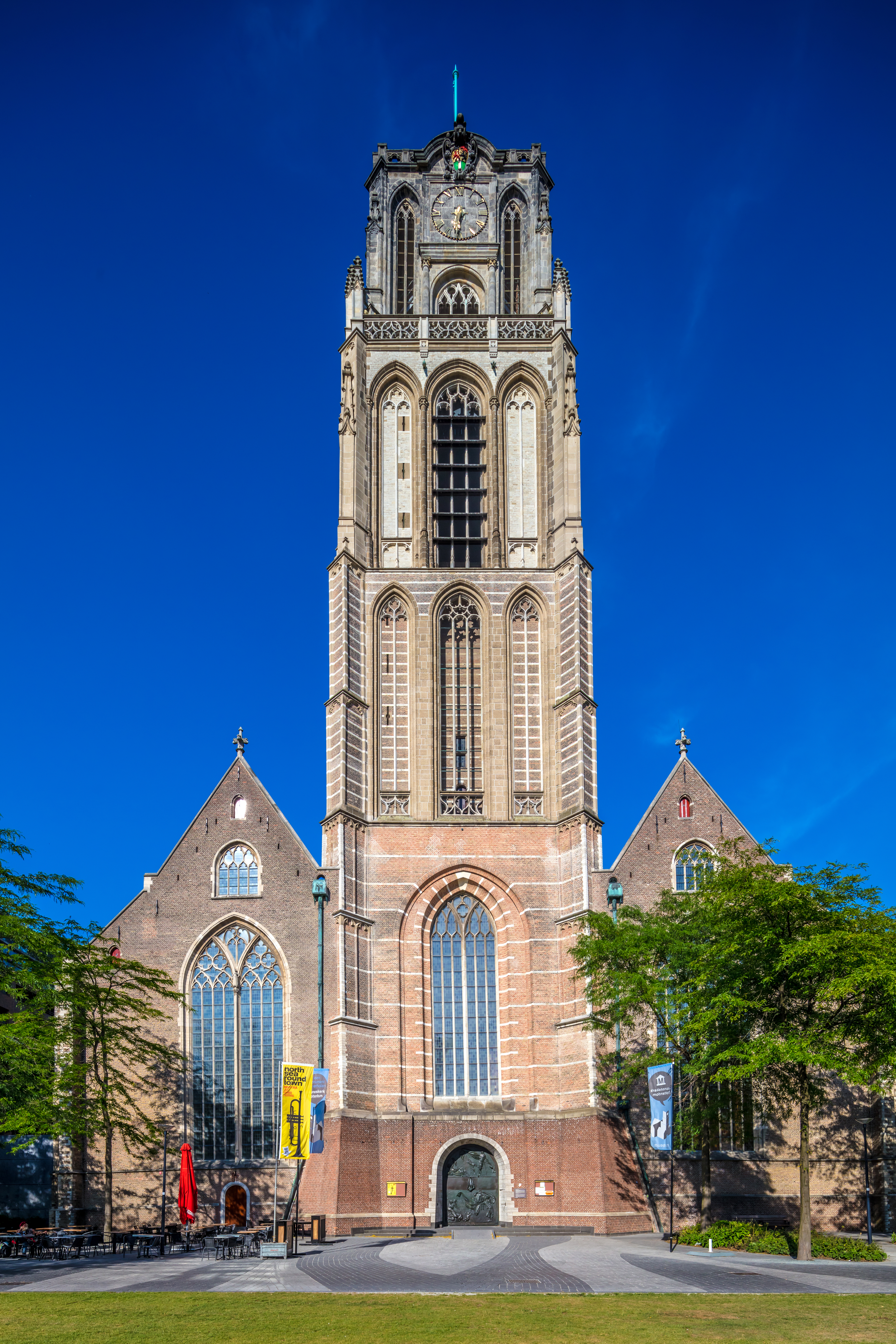
Grote or Sint-Laurenskerk (Rotterdam) in Rotterdam

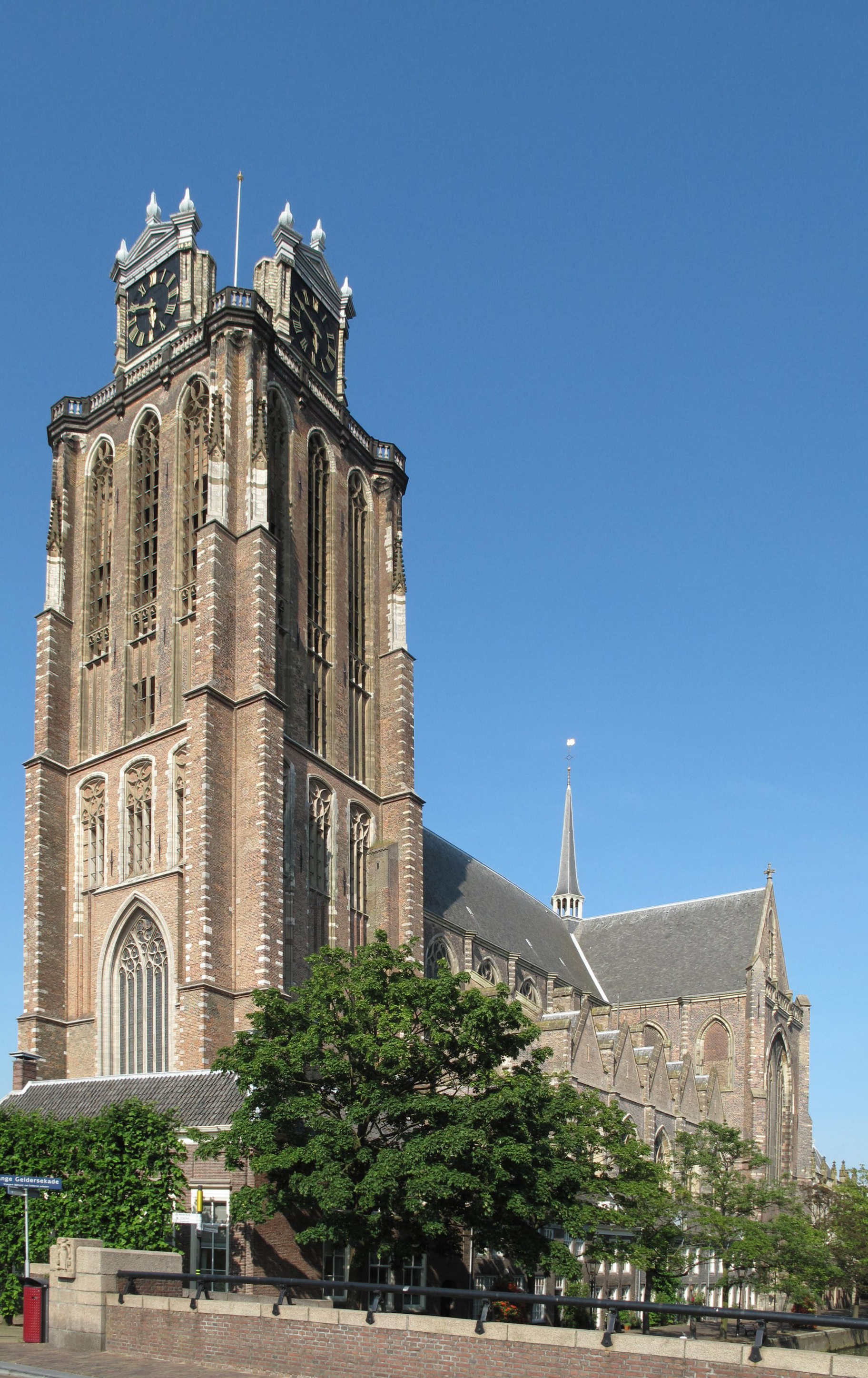
Grote Kerk in Dordrecht

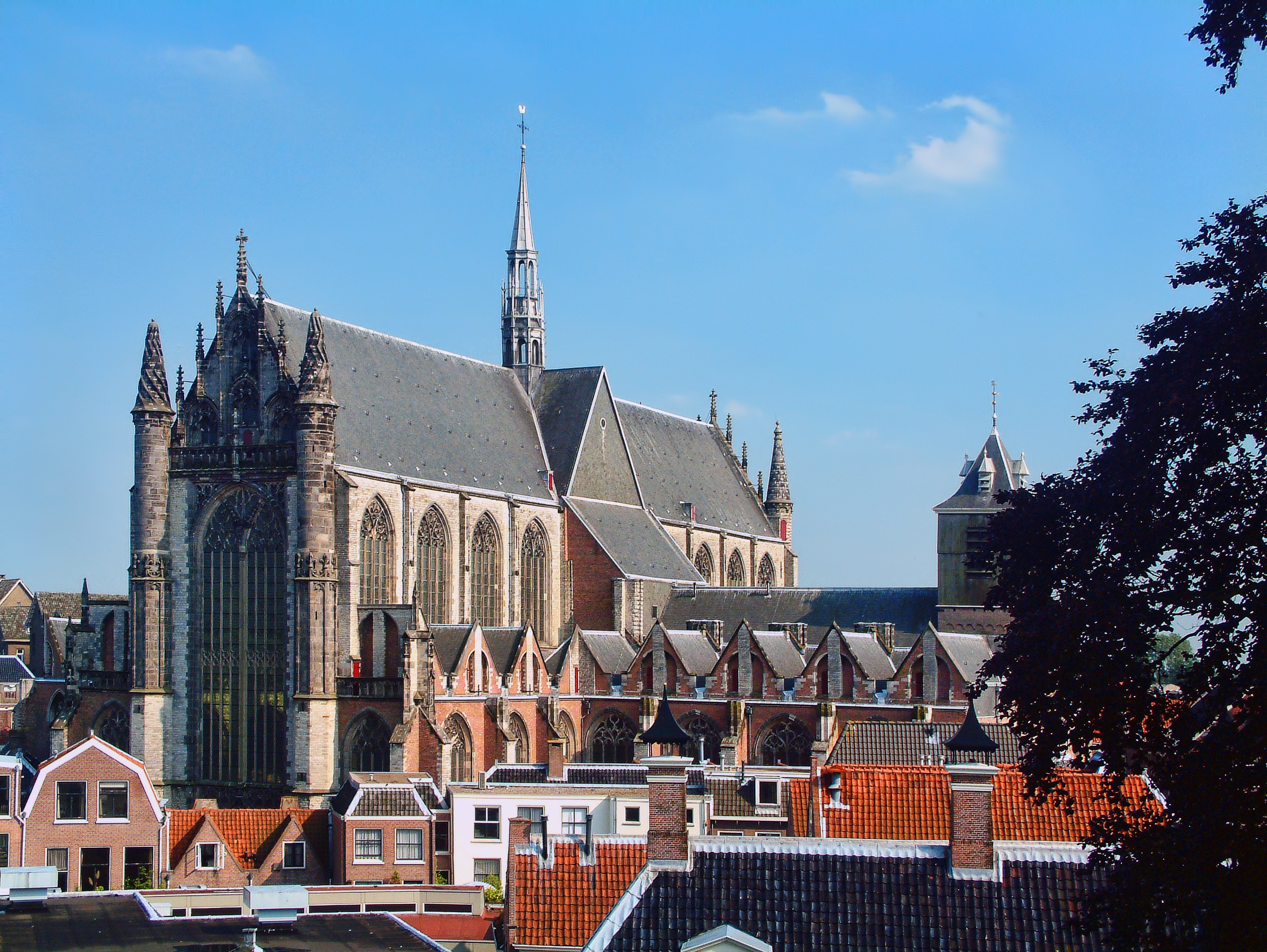
Hooglandse Kerk in Leiden

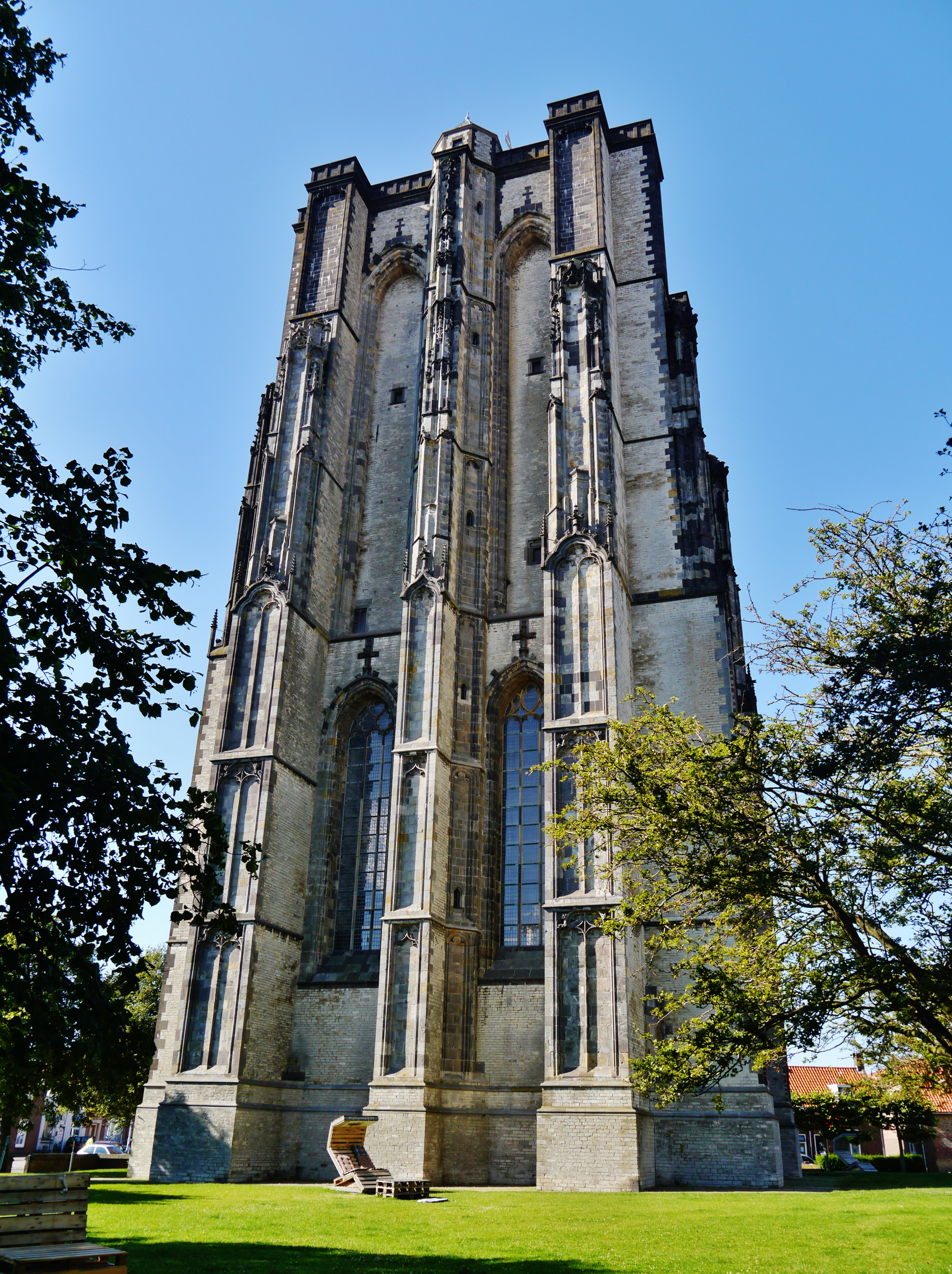
Sint-Lievensmonstertoren in Zierikzee

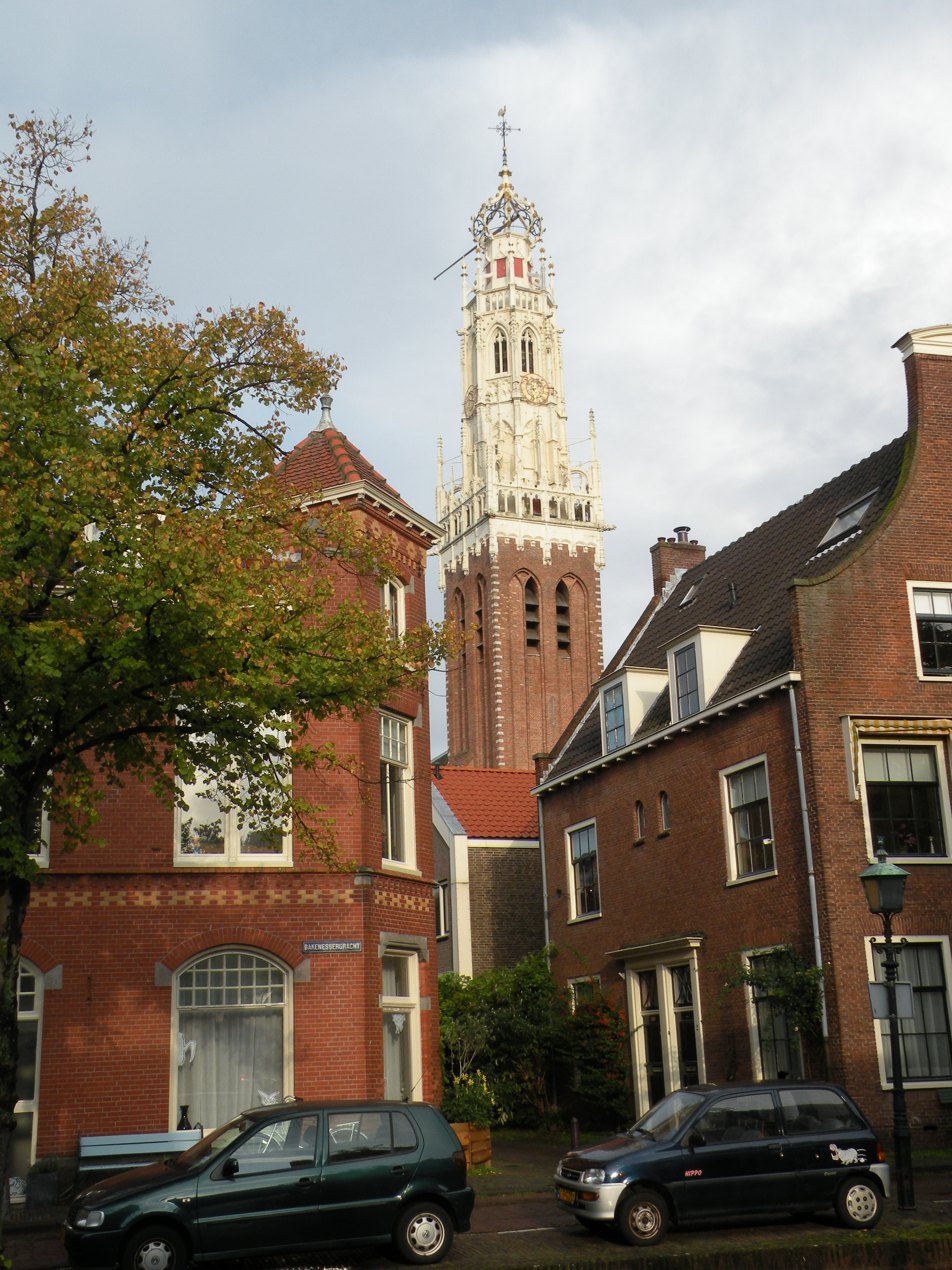
Bakenesserkerk in Haarlem

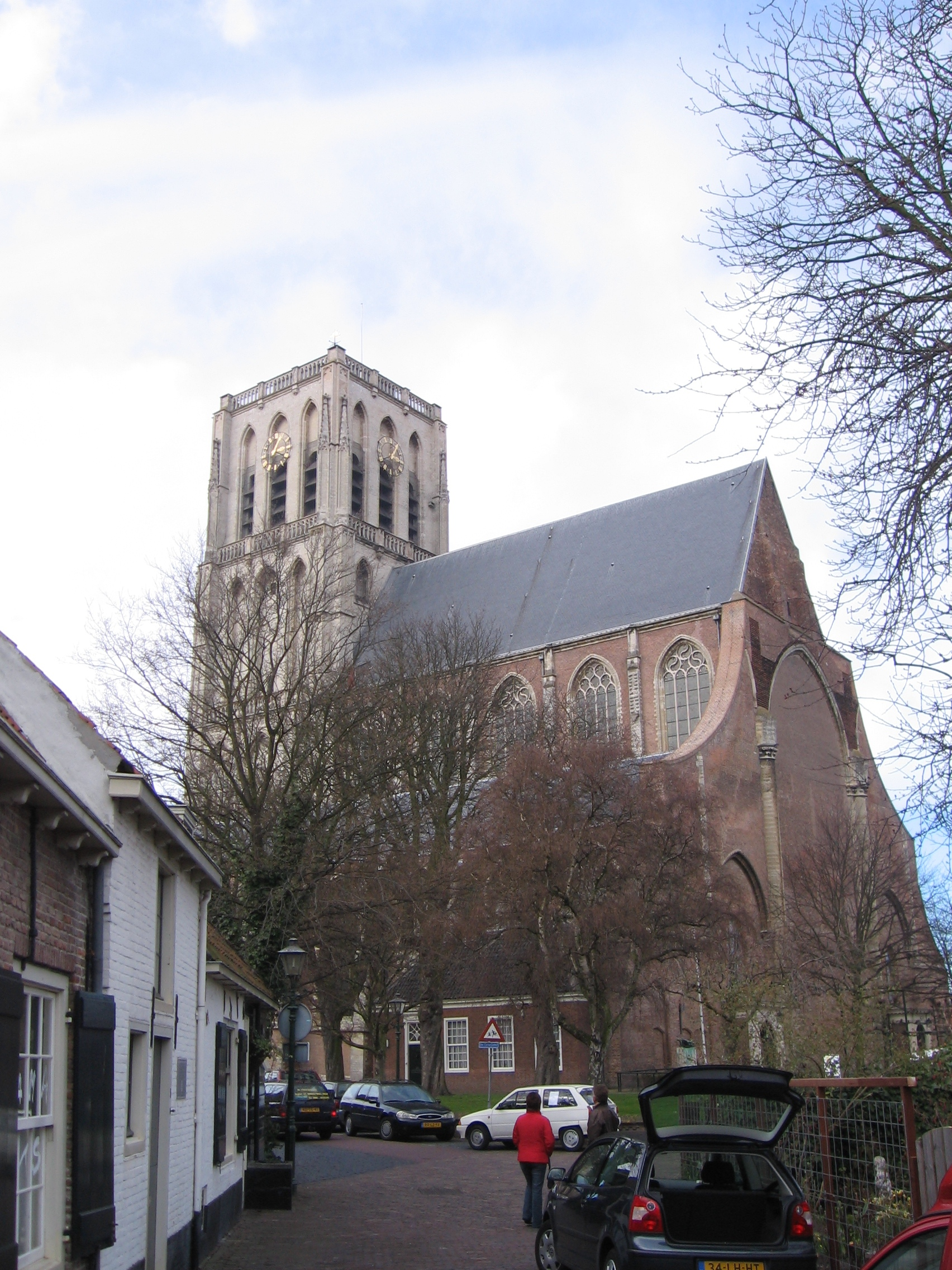
Grote or Sint-Catharijnekerk in Brielle

==== Secular buildings ====
- Gouda's Town Hall (Holland)
- Middelburg's Town Hall (Zeeland)
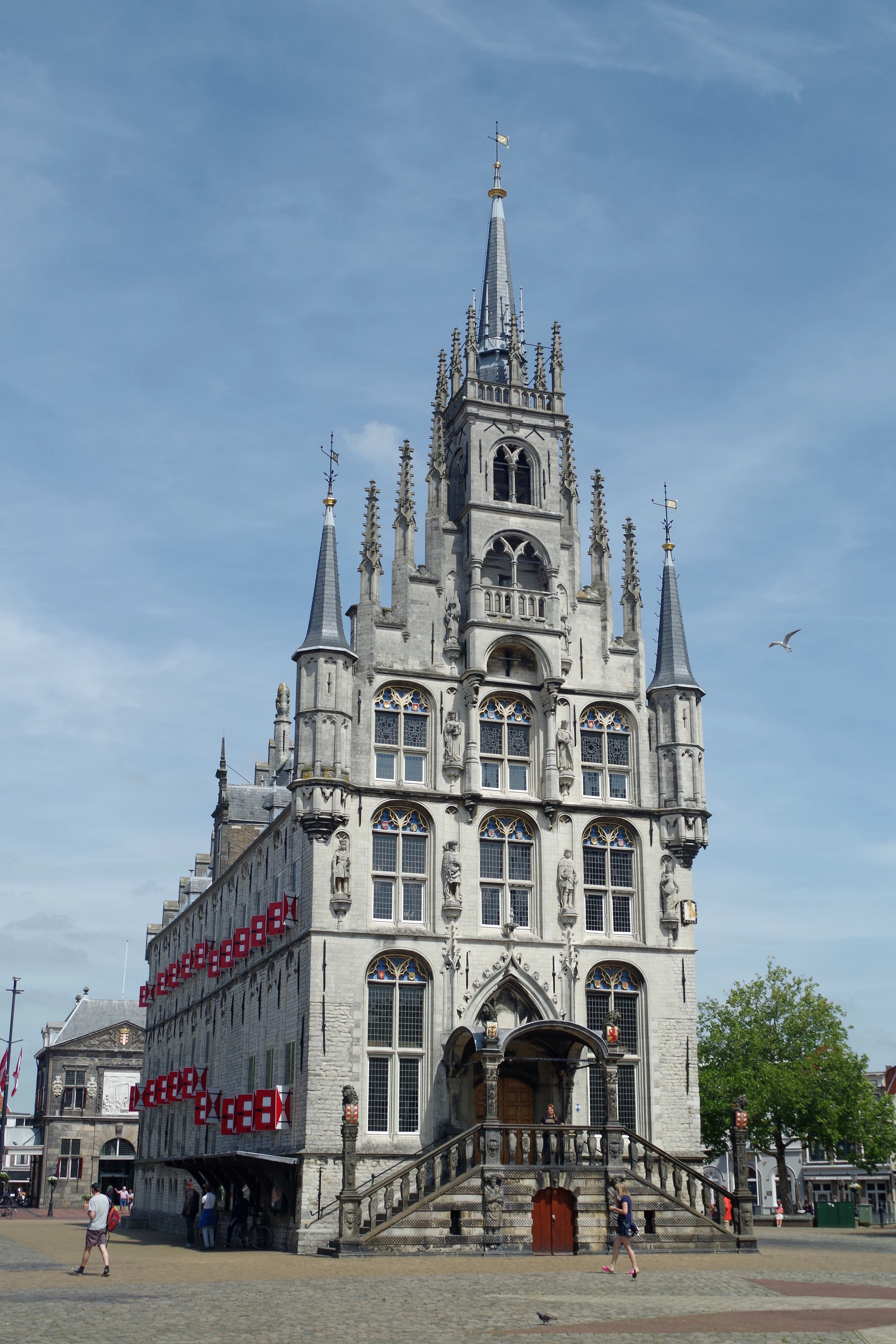
Gouda's Town Hall

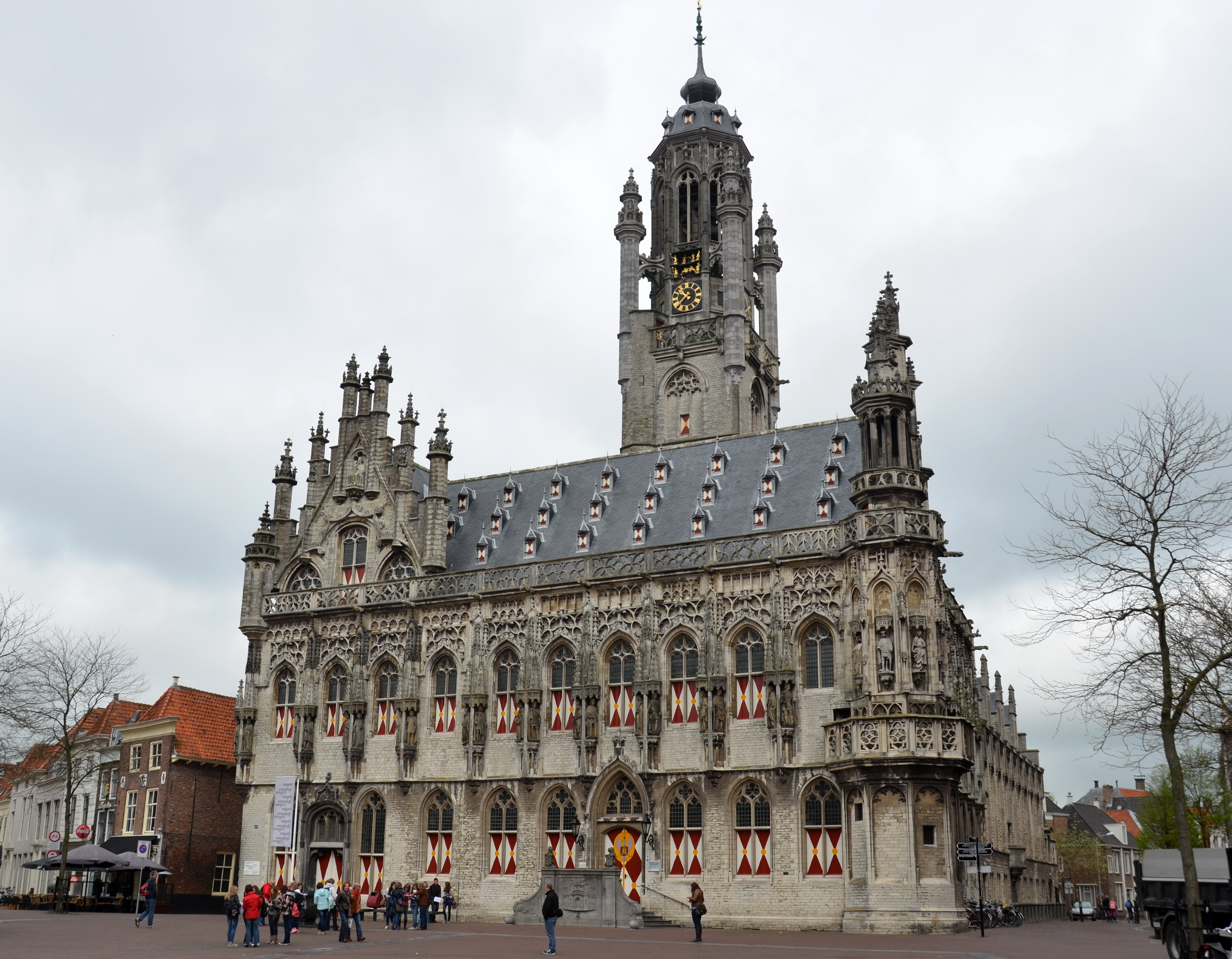
Middelburg's Town Hall

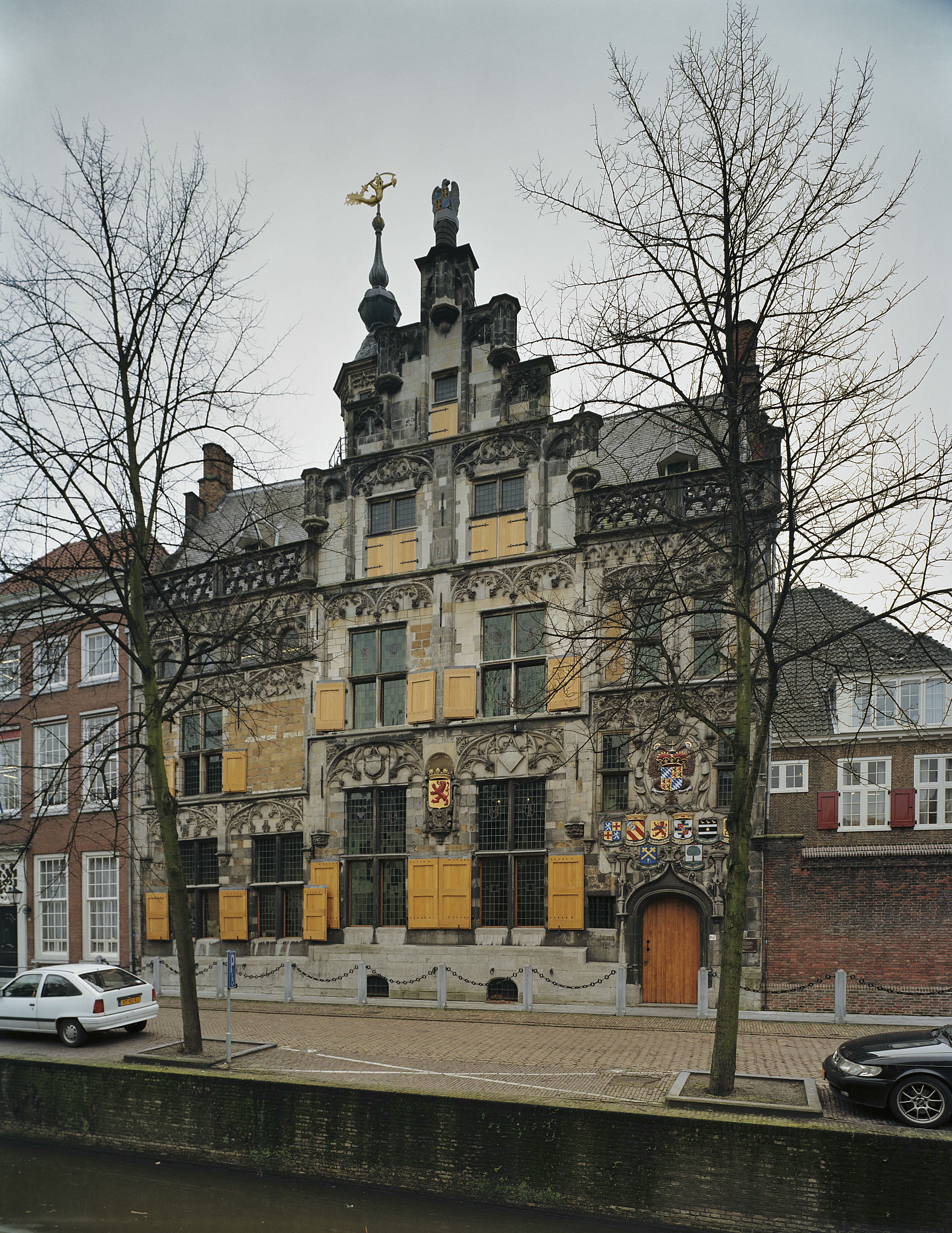
Gemeenlandshuis in Delft

=== Elsewhere ===
==== Ecclesiastical buildings ====
- St. Martin's Cathedral in Ypres, in the former County of Flanders
- St. Michael's Church in Ghent, in the former County of Flanders
- St. Willibrord's Basilica in Hulst, in Zeelandic Flanders: until 1648 in the County of Flanders, currently in the Province of Zeeland in the Netherlands
- St. Waltrude Collegiate Church in Mons, in the former County of Hainaut (built with a hard sandstone and blue limestone)
- St. Lambert's Church in Nederweert, until 1703 in the Prince-bishopric of Liège (though during a part of the 16th century County of Horn), currently in the Province of Limburg in the Netherlands
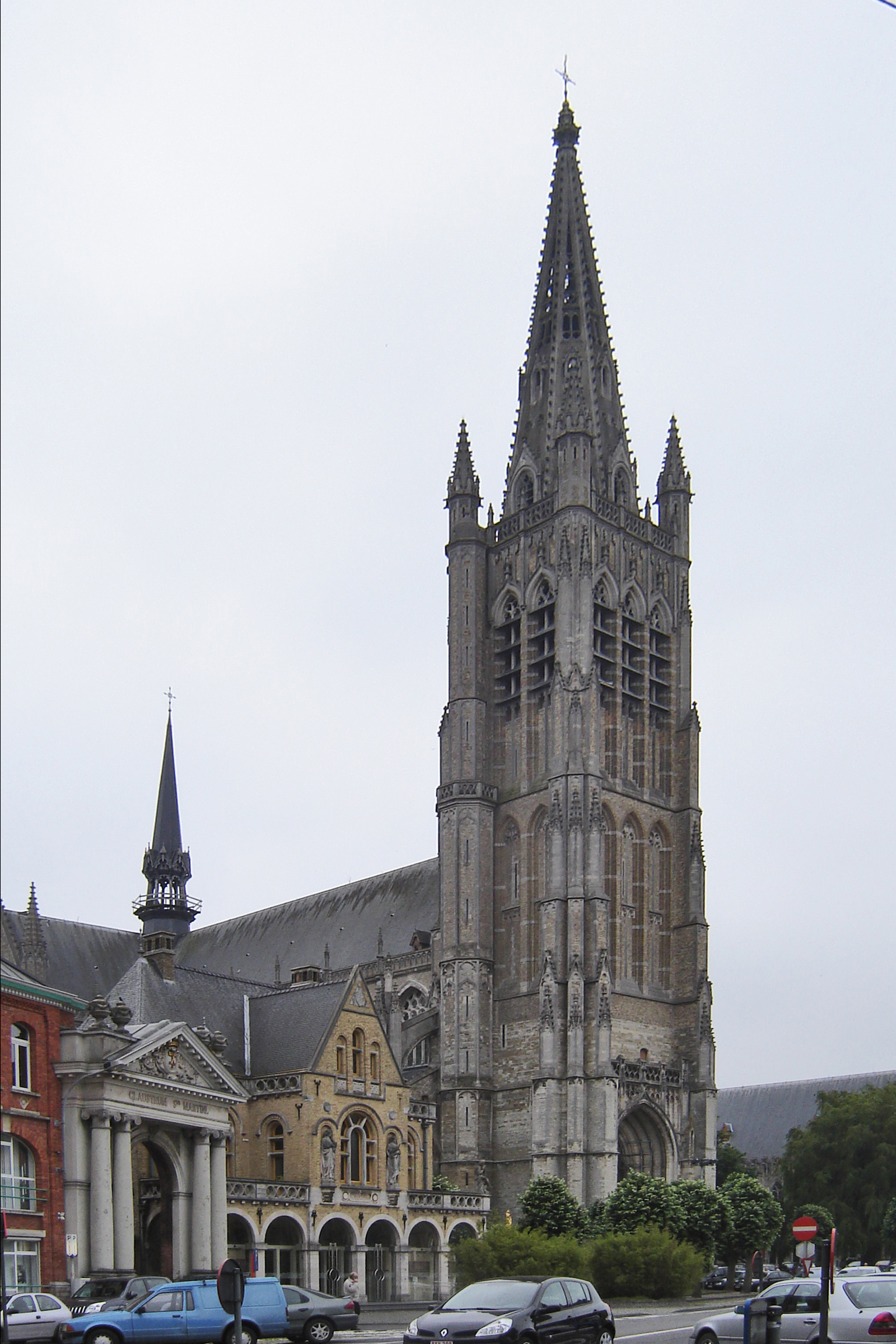
St. Martin's Cathedral in Ypres

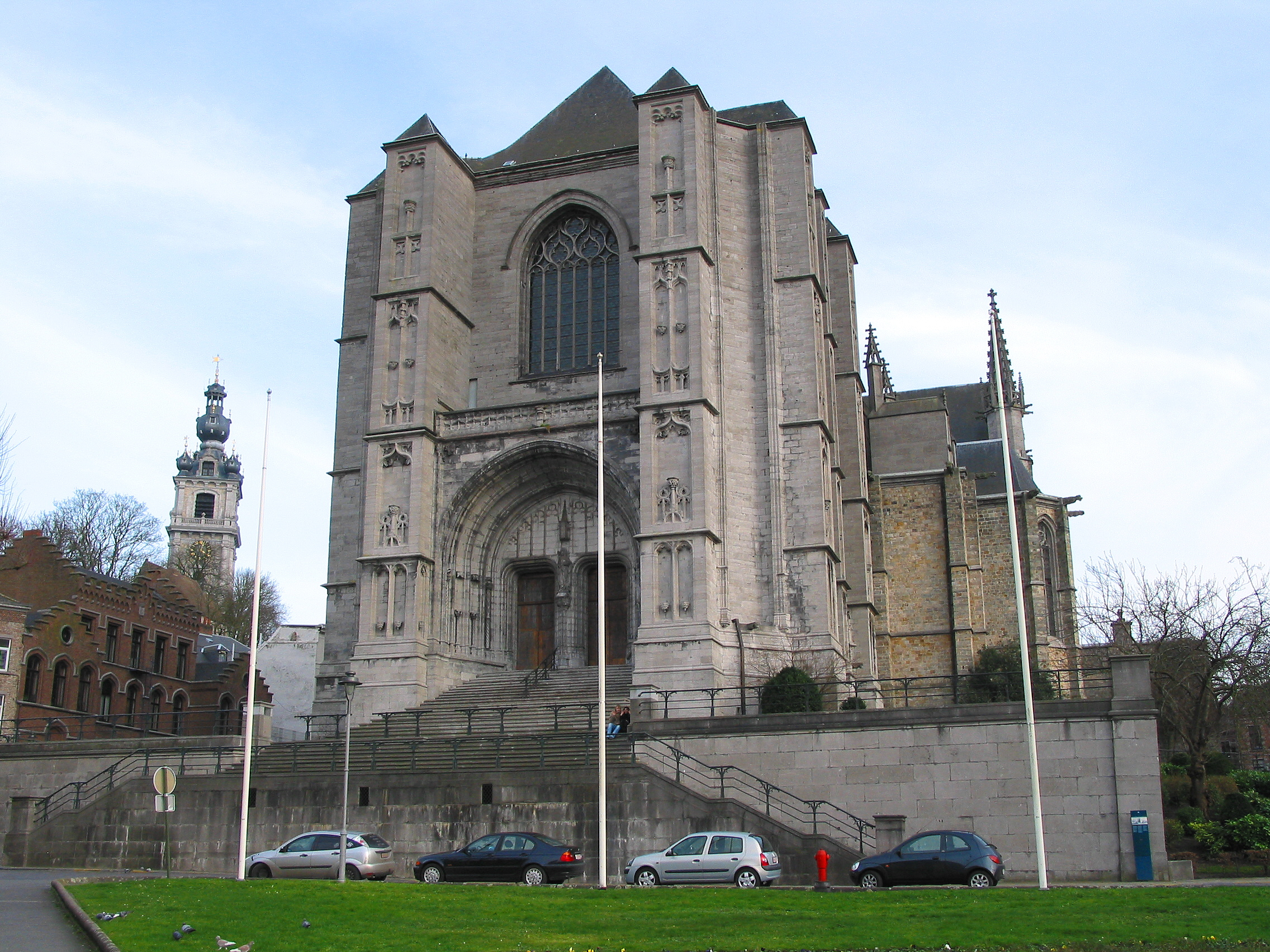
St. Waltrude Collegiate Church in Mons

==== Secular buildings ====
- Damme's Town Hall, in the former County of Flanders
- Oudenaarde's Town Hall, in the former County of Flanders
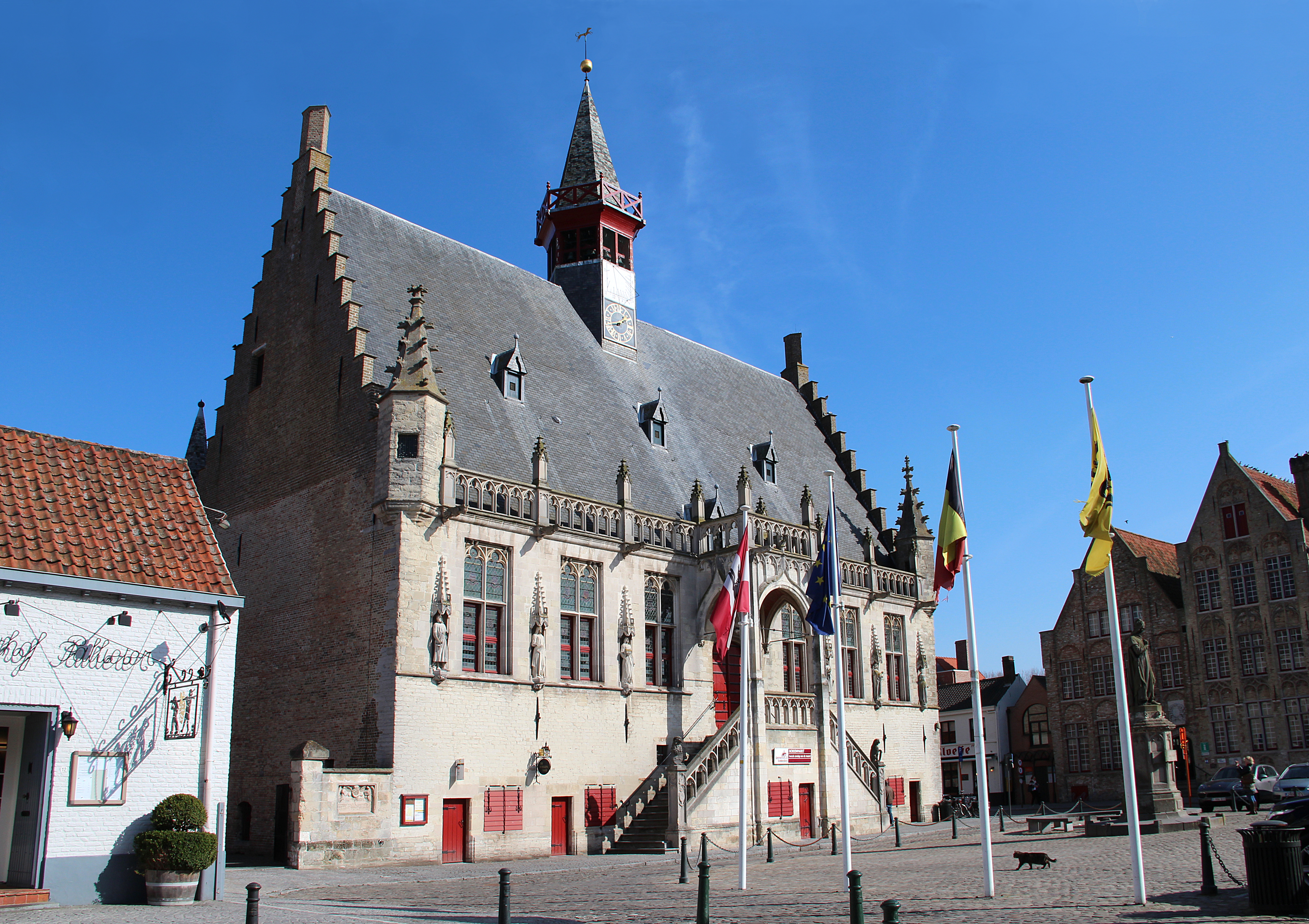
Damme's Town Hall

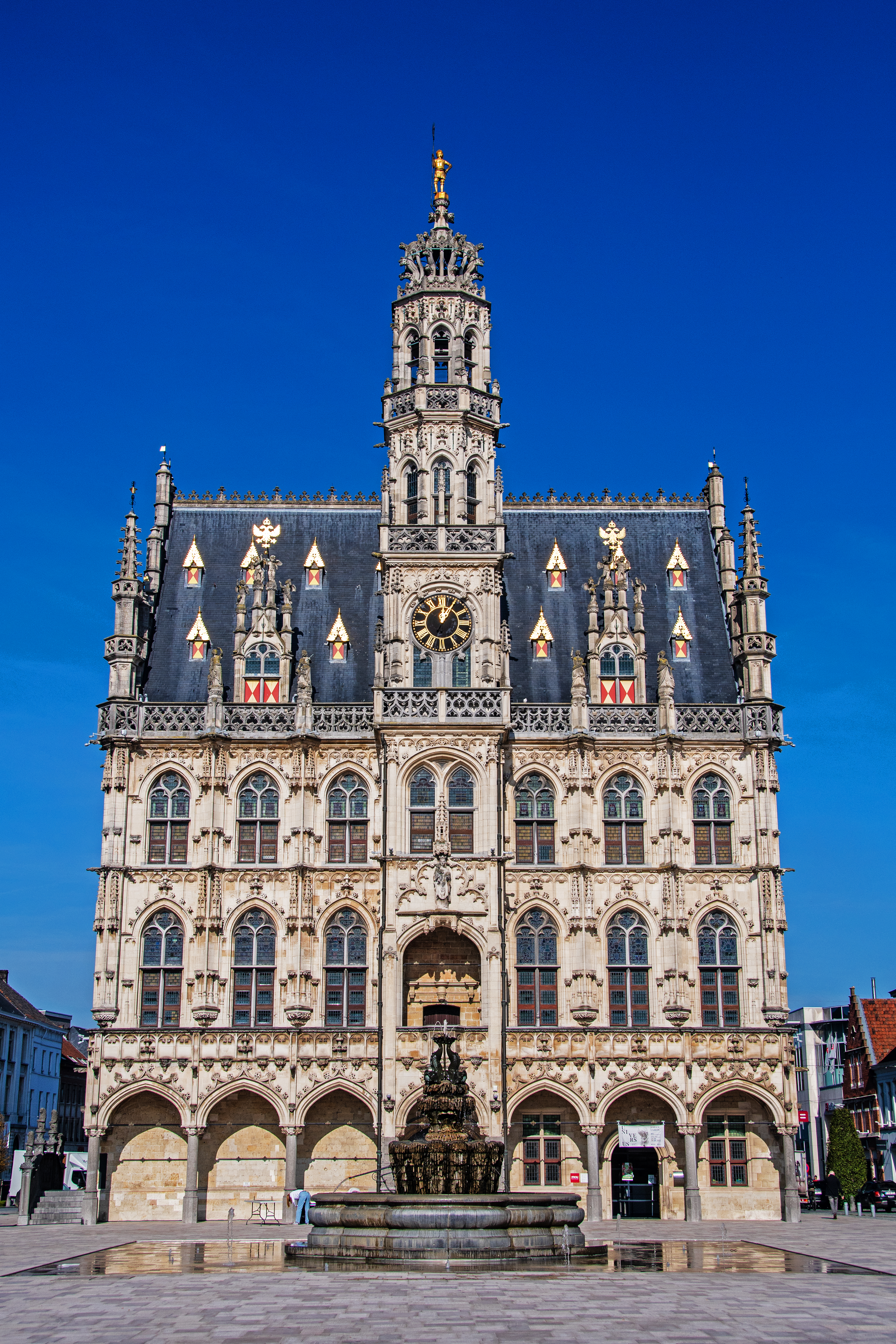
Oudenaarde's Town Hall

== Sources ==
- Cammaerts, Emile. Belgium, From the Roman Invasion to the Present Day. T. Fisher Unwin Ltd, London, 1921 (republished by The Project Gutenberg eBook, 2008). p. 359.
  (Note: Several construction dates have become contradicted by more recent sources)
- "History & styles: Gothic (1254-ca. 1600)". The virtual museum of religious architecture in The Netherlands. www.archimon.nl.
  (On a specialized blog explicitly focusing on the present-day Netherlands, though a few of those described variant styles are prevalent in Belgium.)
- "Steen: materialen, technieken en toepassingen" (PDF) (in Dutch). Heemkring Opwijk-Mazenzele, Belgium. Archived from the original (PDF) on 2011-06-26.
  (Stone: materials, techniques, and applications - focused on Belgium and south-eastern Netherlands)
- "Geschiedenis van de bouwkunst – Hoofdstuk 2 Gotische bouwkunst" (PDF) (in Dutch). Sint Lukas Kunsthumaniora, Belgium (Online tool for 5th and 6th year students of Architectural and Interior Arts).
  (History of Gothic architecture - international, and specific attention for Belgium)
- Defoort, Herman. "Gotische kunst". Websthetica, Tekststek voor kunst en esthetica sinds 2001 (in Dutch).
  (Gothic - international, and specific attention for Brabantine Gothic)
- Savenije, Marjan; Smelt, Susan. "Wat zijn de kenmerken van de gotische architectuur?" (PDF) (in Dutch). Rooms-Katholieke Scholengemeenschappen Pius X College en St.-Canisius, Almelo, Netherlands. Archived from the original (PDF) on 27 March 2012.
  (Sober description of Gothic styles in the Low Counties)
- de Naeyer, André. "La reconstruction des monuments et des sites en Belgique après la première guerre mondiale" (Pdf 2.2 KB). Monumentum Vol. XX-XXI-XXII, 1982 (in French). Documentation Centre Unesco - Icomos. pp. 167–187.
  (The Reconstruction of Monuments and Sites in Belgium after World War I)
