= Jean d'Oisy =

Historical European architect

Not to be confounded with Jean d'Oisy, organist at the Grand Organ in the Notre Dame de Paris from 1570 until 1579

Jean d'Oisy (alternatively called Jehan d'Oisy, Jan van Osy) (1310–1377) was the architect of several ecclesiastical buildings in Brabantine Gothic style. He was one of the earliest introducers of northern French Gothic style into the Low Countries and a teacher of the reputed Brabantian architect Jacob van Thienen.

D'Oisy was born in Valenciennes. Sources occasionally call him French or a Frenchman, or say that he was from Hainaut, which is currently a province in the Walloon Region of Belgium. His birthplace, now in the département Nord in France, was in the County of Hainaut and had belonged to the Holy Roman Empire, though since 1285 it had used French currency. In Jean d'Oisy's lifetime, the county formed personal unions with the County of Holland (1299–1436) and with Bavaria-Straubing (1356–1417). As from at most 26 years of age onwards, he lived in the Duchy of Brabant and for his works applied the style that became named after that area; he may be regarded as a Brabantian architect. He died in Brussels.

He is noted for (parts of):

- St. Rumbold's Cathedral in Mechelen (from 1335, 1342-1375)
- Possibly the Saint Martin's Basilica in Halle (1341–1377) (Also Jacob van Thienen gets mentioned.)
- Church of Our Lady-at-the-Pool in Tienen (1358–1375)
