= Heilige Drievuldigheidscollege =

School in Leuven, Belgium

Coordinates: 50.8769°N 4.69861°E

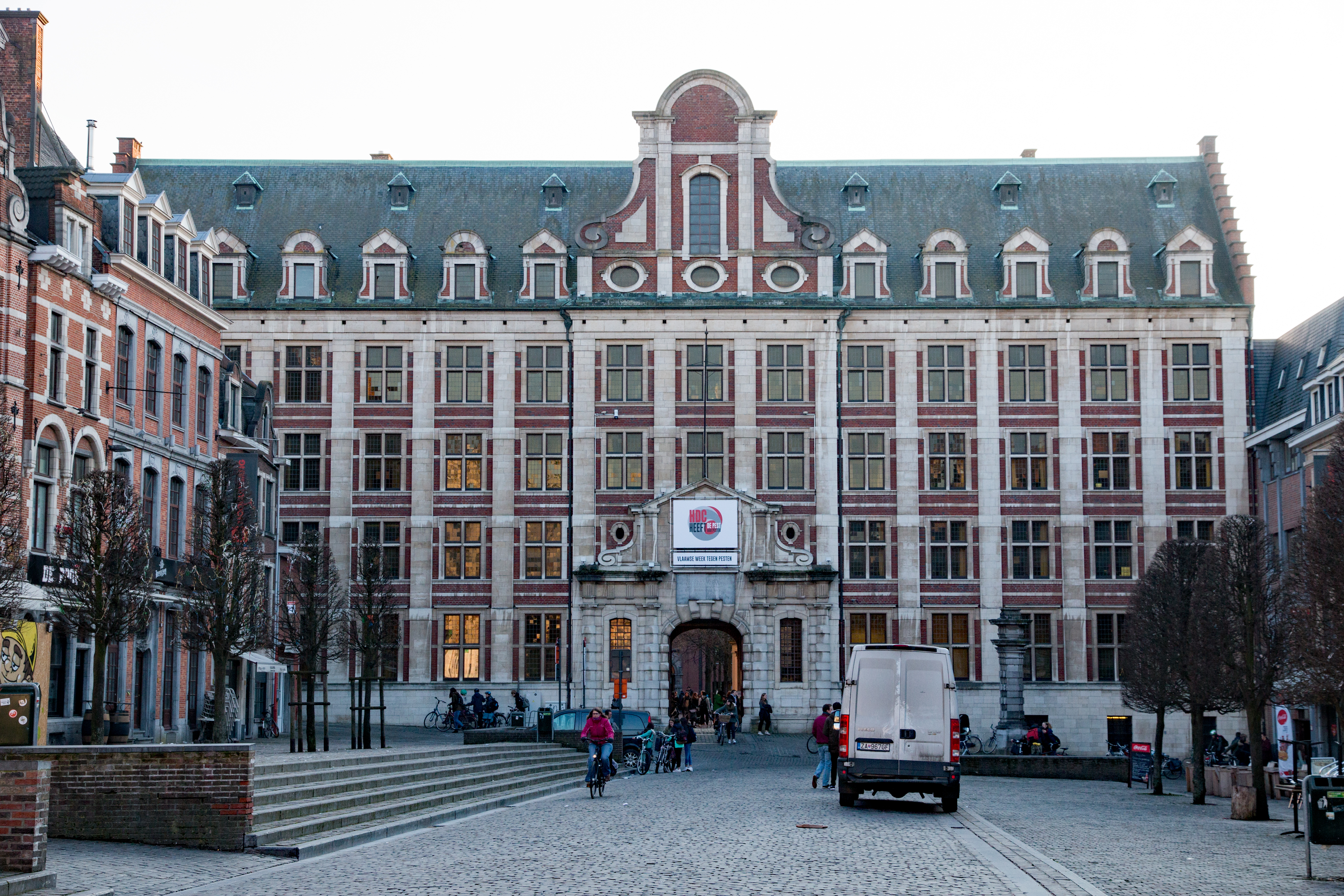
Heilige-Drievuldigheidscollege at the end of the Leuven Old Market

Heilige-Drievuldigheidscollege or the "Holy Trinity College Preparatory School" is a school in the city of Leuven in the Flemish Brabant province of Belgium.

The Holy-Trinity College is a Catholic school established by the Josephites of Belgium in the heart of Leuven. The school has a primary school and a secondary school. The basic options available to students are modern sciences, human sciences, economics, Latin and Latin-Greek. In the second and third grade there is an almost complete range of studies in general secondary education.

== History ==
The school was founded in 1843 by canon Constant van Crombrugghe, founder of the Congregation of the Josephites, on the site of the former Trinity College, Leuven. The main entrance to the school is located on the edge of the Old Market, the rear of the school is at the Father Damien Square, where the mortal remains of saint Damien of Molokai rest in the crypt of the St. Anthony Church. The Josephites also have in Egenhovenbos in Heverlee a country estate for the monks and students since 1870. This was still used until 2010 for reflections and extracurricular activities by the school when it was sold. The estate was leased in 1870 by the Duke of Arenberg. After World War I the property became nationalized and Josephites could purchase the Jozefietengoed in 1924 from the Belgian state. The school itself and the adjoining convent of the order, was badly hit on May 12, 1944, by a bombardment of the Allied air forces.

In 2001, the school joined the school board of the school community: Leuven Catholic Schools at the Dyle (LKSD).

In August 2024, the school made headlines after announcing it would make Arabic a compulsory subject for senior modern language students.

== Famous alumni ==
- Charles-Jean de La Vallée Poussin
- Félicien Marceau
- Henry Moeller
- Peter Vandenbempt
- Jef Aerts
- Michel Wuyts
- Luc Steeno
- Philip Verheyen

== See also ==
- Holy Trinity
