= Grote Markt, Leuven =

Square in Leuven, Belgium

Grote Markt
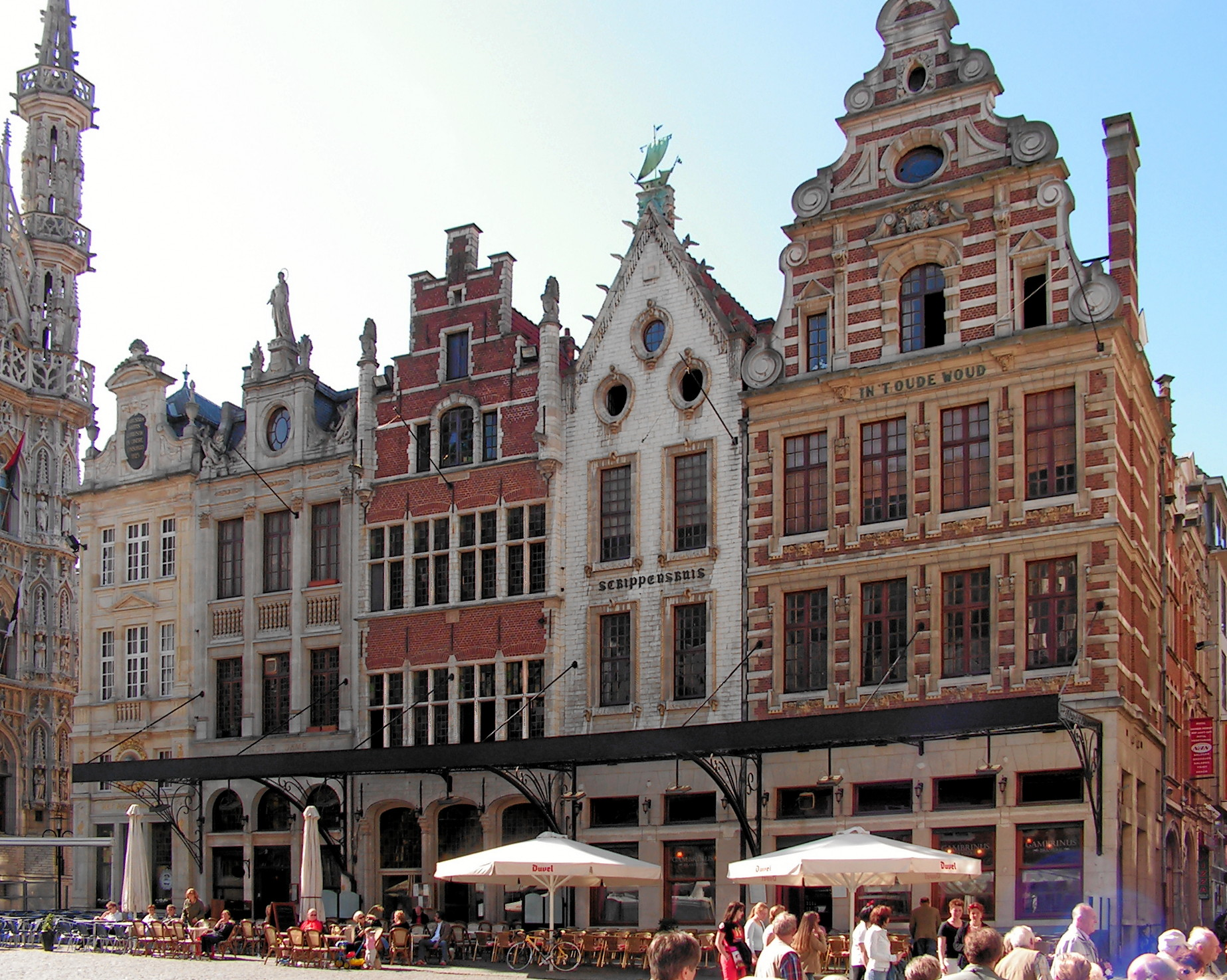
- Guildhalls on Leuven's Grote Markt

- Location within Belgium
- Location: Leuven, Flemish Brabant, Belgium
- Coordinates: 50°52′45″N 4°42′05″E

The Grote Markt (Dutch: [ˌɣroːtə ˈmɑr(ə)kt]; "Big Market") is the central square of Leuven, Flemish Brabant, Belgium. It is situated between the Oude Markt ("Old Square") and the Rector De Somerplein ("Rector De Somer Square", named for Pieter De Somer, the first rector of the autonomous Dutch-speaking Katholieke Universiteit Leuven (KU Leuven) in 1968) and near both the Bondgenotenlaan ("Avenue of the Allied Forces") and the Muntstraat ("Mint Street").

The Grote Markt's location on the crossing of some of Leuven's most famous and most touristic spots make it one of the city's busiest squares. It has been pedestrian-friendly for some years; only public transportation buses from De Lijn are allowed to use the square.

== History and buildings ==
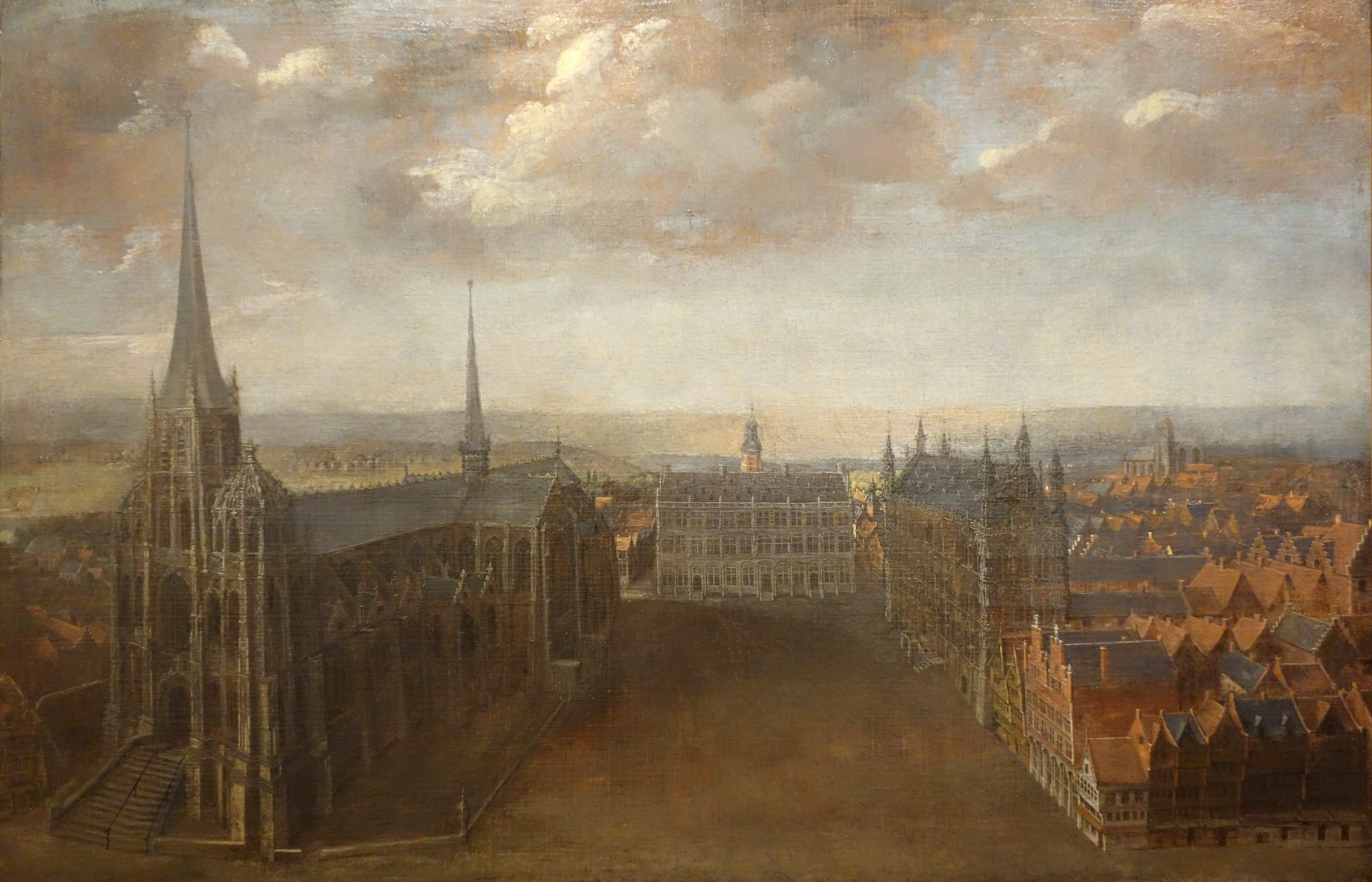
View of the Great Market Square in Leuven by Wolfgang de Smet, c. 1667

The Grote Markt's location is one of the oldest and most historic in all of Leuven. The square has existed in its present form since the 14th century, when the Old University of Leuven was established. Most of the square's buildings are built in the Gothic style, of which the Town Hall is a prime example.

Other buildings on the Grote Markt are the Church of St. Peter and several guildhalls. As throughout Leuven, there are also many pubs, taverns, and eateries on the Grote Markt. There is a significant contrast between the more formal and traditional style establishments on the Grote Markt and the more trendy, youth-oriented and student entertainment spots on the nearby Oude Markt.

== Events ==
The Grote Markt is often used for cultural and other events, as is the case for Leuven's other big squares, such as the Oude Markt and the Mgr. Ladeuzeplein ("Mgr. Ladeuze Square"),

=== Flower Carpet ===
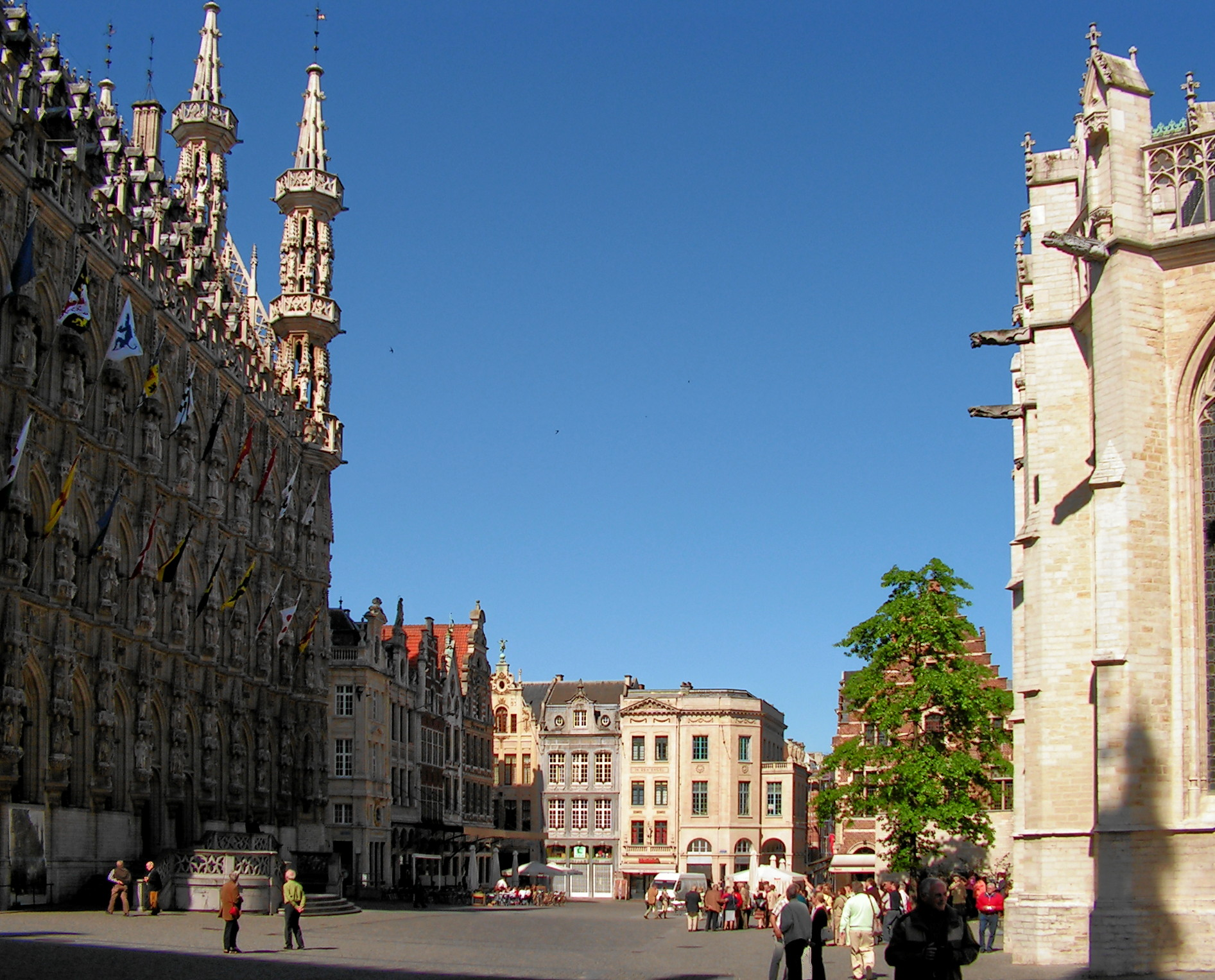
The Grote Markt with the Town Hall (left) and the Church of St. Peter (right)

One yearly event is the transformation of the Grote Markt into one large flower carpet. Each year celebrates a particular theme, such as 2007's Bicentennial of the Leuven Fire Department.

In 2005, an administrative mistake caused the yearly flower carpet, completely made of begonias that year, to coincide with the opening and start of the local cycling contest, named after Jef Scherens. To avoid having the cyclists start their contest out of the middle of the flower carpet, then-mayor Louis Tobback proposed a compromise: the cyclists would start their race from the outskirts of the square instead of the centre, and as compensation, the theme of that year's flower carpet would be the Tribute to Cycling.

=== Summer Events ===
Being a university town, Leuven undergoes a drastic decrease in its usual population when thousands of students go home for the summer. For the last twenty odd years, the city of Leuven tries to compensate for the lack of students (along with their associated social activities) by organising a number of summer events. Some of these taking place on the Grote Markt, among other spots in town, are:

- Beleuvenissen: weekly concerts on Friday nights in July, with themes such as salsa, tropical, jazz, blues.
- Hapje-Tapje (literally: a little snack-a small drink, approximately pronounced in English as hap-yeh, tap-yeh): a gastronomical market during which participating restaurants set up stalls on the streets and squares of Leuven and offer small plates of their best food for a bargain price.

=== Planting of the Meyboom ===
One of the oldest events is the planting of the Meyboom ("May tree" – in fact, a corruption of the Dutch word, meaning tree of joy) which, in contrast with the British version, is not a pole as such but an actual tree, usually a large birch tree. The origin of the Meyboom celebration in Leuven is reminiscent of the town's long-standing (folkloric) feud with neighbouring Brussels. The tradition goes back seven centuries, and according to the local folklore, commemorates a victory of Brussels over Leuven, although others claim the origin was a wedding ceremony during which a nobleman from Leuven married a lower class girl from Brussels. The nobleman then gave money to celebrate Saint Lawrence, the local patron saint, and plant a tree of joy or Meyboom in his honour.

The legend is told slightly differently in Brussels than in Leuven. It claims that one day in 1213, a wedding was held in a guinguette (i.e. small tavern) just outside Brussels. During the festivities, the guests noticed a gang of troublemakers from Leuven. A fight broke out, and just when the wedding guests from Brussels were losing the fight, the Companions of St Lawrence, a city guild, came to their rescue. The Leuven gang lost and Duke Henri I of Brabant gave the guild members permission to plant the Meyboom each year on 9 August; but this privilege would be lost if ever the people of Leuven managed to capture the tree before 5 p.m.
