= Ladeuzeplein =

Square in Leuven, Belgium

Coordinates: 50°52′42″N 4°42′20″E

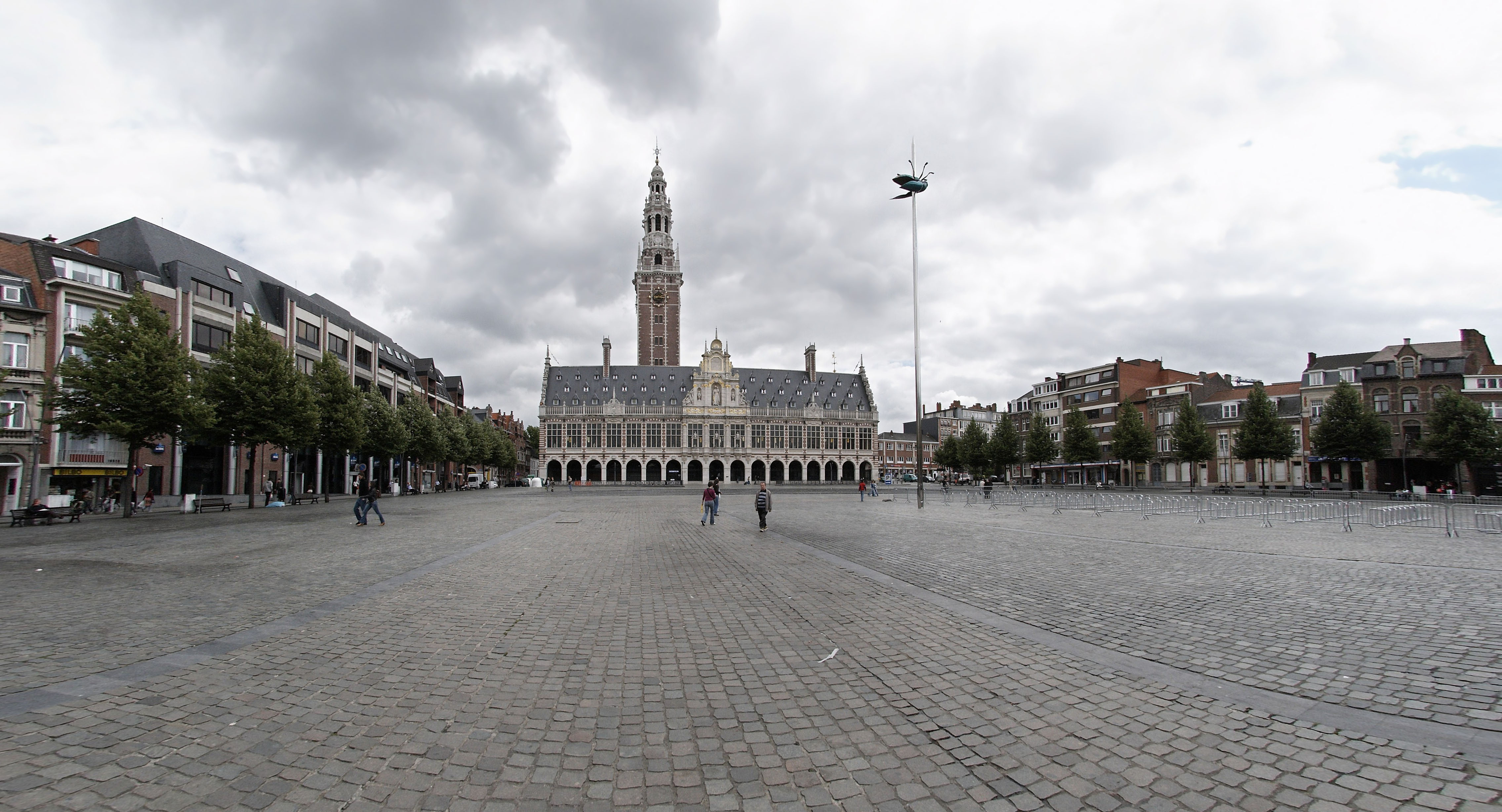
Overview of the Mgr. Ladeuzeplein, Leuven

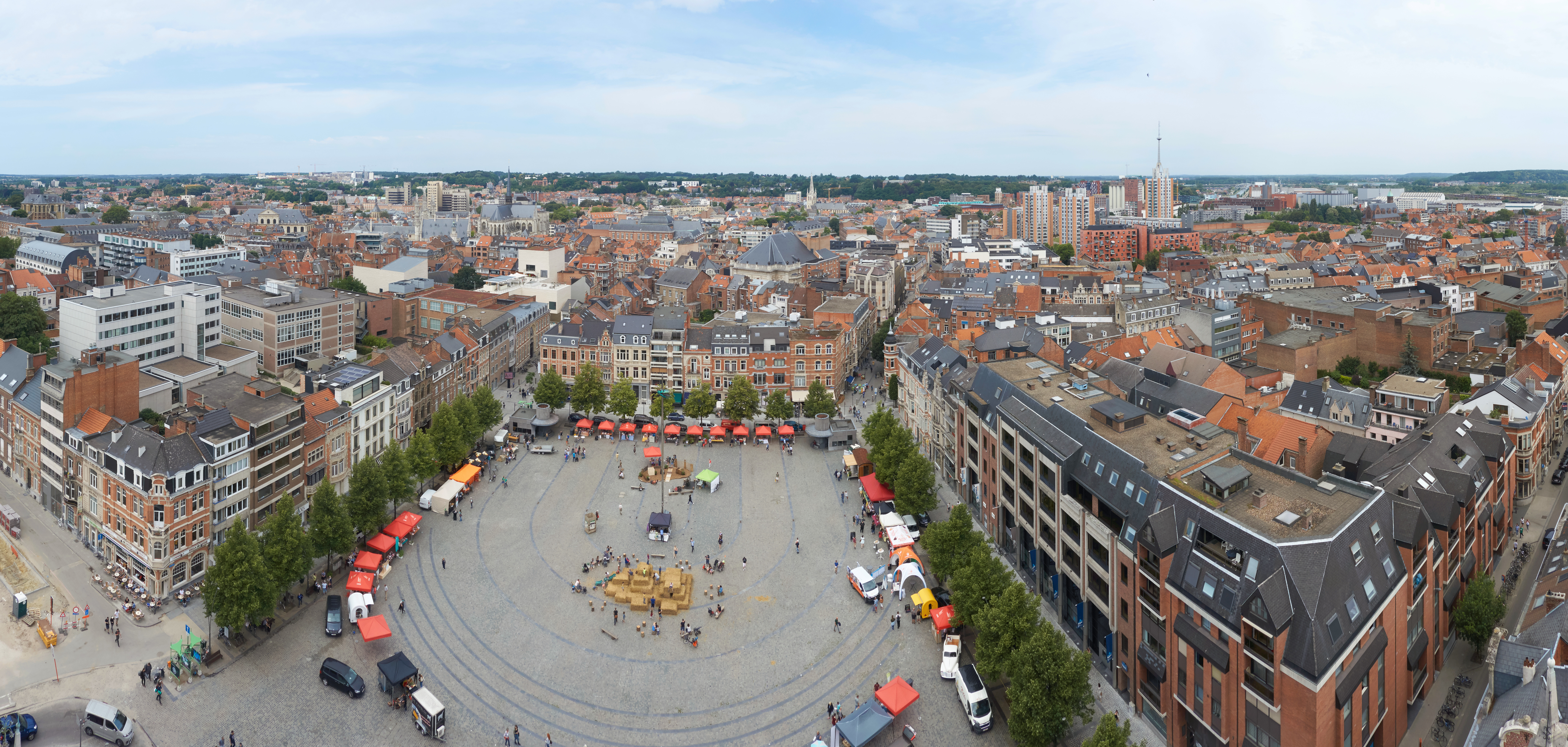
View of the Mgr. Ladeuzeplein from the tower of the Library of the KU Leuven

The Mgr. Ladeuzeplein (English: Mgr. Ladeuze Square) is the largest square in the centre of Leuven, Flemish Brabant, Belgium. The square was named after a former rector of the Catholic University of Leuven, Mgr. Paulin Ladeuze. The central library of the Katholieke Universiteit Leuven (KU Leuven) is located on this square.

== Toponymy ==
Among the local population the square was known as the Jeirkarlisse. This name is derived from the Clarisse religious order who used to have a monastery at this location, when it still was a sandy hill (jer refers in the local dialect to dirt, thus unpaved, as contrary to the adjacent Stiënkarlisse, the former paved Graanmarkt, now the Herbert Hooverplein).

In 1783, the monastery was abolished and the city of Leuven bought the estate from the authorities, who had inherited it, in order to establish a market dedicated to the sale of wood. The hill was levelled off and the first house on the square was erected in 1812. At this time, the square was named the Place Napoleon ("Napoleon Square"). Later, it was renamed the Volksplaats ("People's Place"), before acquiring its current name after World War II.

== University Library ==
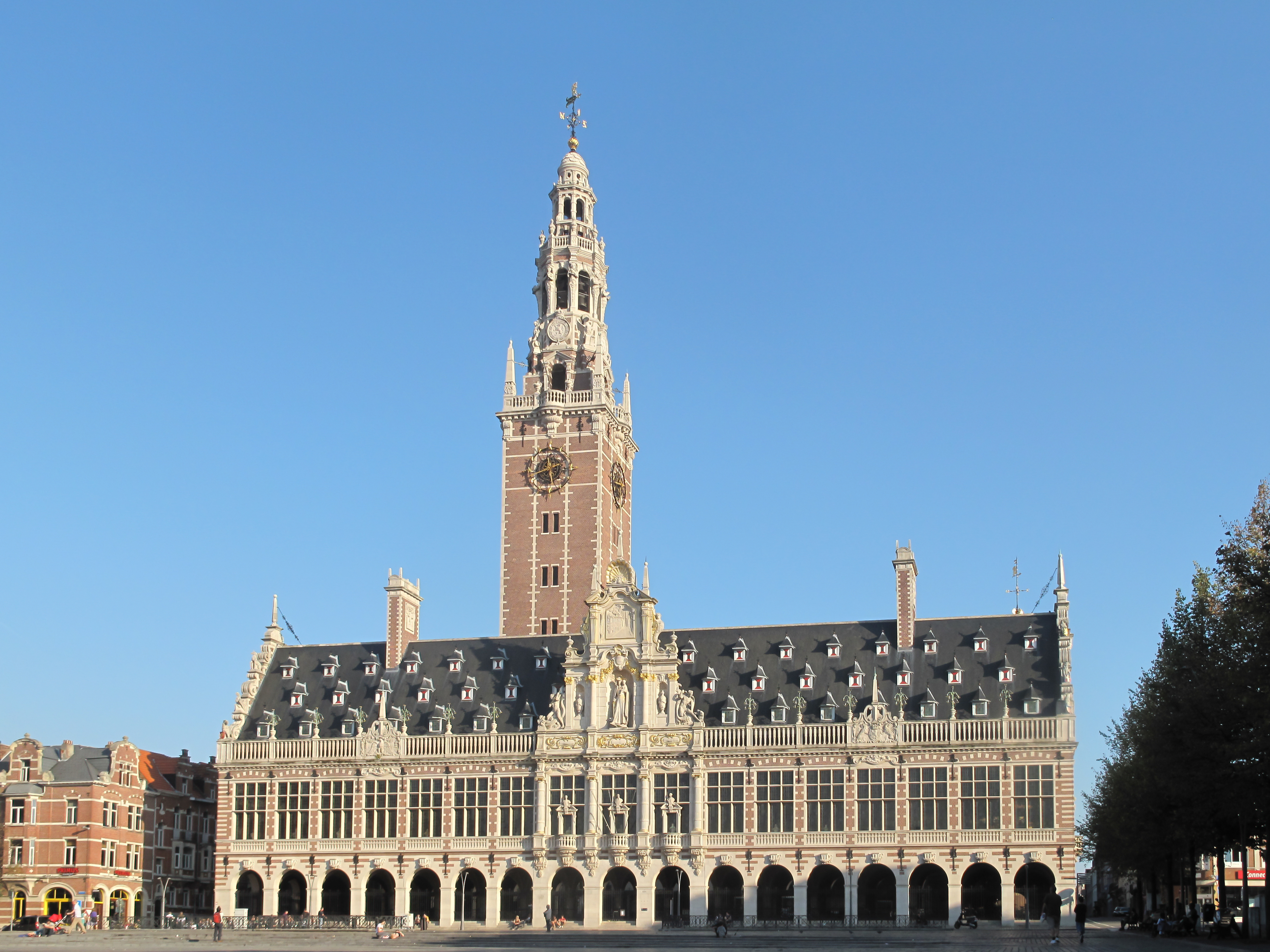
Central Library of the KU Leuven, seen from the square

The square is dominated visually by the monumental central library of the KU Leuven. Even though the neo-Renaissance exterior implies otherwise, the building is relatively recent, dating from 1921. The library was a gift from the American people to the city of Leuven, after the original 17th-century library near the Grote Markt was burned down by the German occupying forces in August 1914. The fire destroyed not only a large part of the cultural patrimony of the medieval city, but it also caused the loss of countless and irreplaceable historical manuscripts and books, many dating back centuries.

This act of violence caused uproar throughout the world and several, mostly American, charities were established to compensate the loss, so in 1921 work was begun to build a new library, on the square now known as Ladeuzeplein. The architect of the Leuven library was Whitney Warren. Although the architect was American, he employed a neo-Flemish Renaissance style for this commission. Great Britain (on the initiative of the John Rylands Library in Manchester) and the United States were major providers of material for the replenishment of the collection. The new library building was financed by the National Committee of the United States for the Restoration of the University of Louvain including the Carnegie Endowment for International Peace, which also built libraries in the war-damaged cities of Rheims and Belgrade.

The new building also contains one of the largest carillons in Europe. It was created and offered as a gift in 1928 by US engineers as a monument of remembrance for all colleagues who lost their lives during World War I. The carillon originally contained 48 bells, that being the number of states in the Union at the time of the gift. The main bell, which rings every hour on the hour, is named the Liberty Bell of Louvain and the fourth largest bell contains an inscription calling for world peace.

In May 1940, in the first year of World War II, the German occupiers again destroyed, almost completely, the (new) University Library. After the war, the building was reconstructed almost completely along the original plans. After a substantial renovation from 1999 to 2003, the exterior, carillon and roof structure are once again restored to their former beauty and dominate views of the square.

In January 2014, a permanent exhibit on these wartime events was installed over five floors of the bell tower.

== Art ==
In 2004, the KU Leuven celebrated the 575th anniversary of the foundation of the Old University of Leuven, and decided to thank the city of Leuven for its hospitality by asking renowned artist Jan Fabre to create a fitting sculpture and present it as a gift to the city. Fabre designed a modern art installation called the Totem. It consists of a huge Thai jewel beetle stuck on a 75-foot (23 m) high steel needle. According to the author, the juxtaposition of the surreal view of the "bug on a needle" in front of the neo-classical library building perfectly captures the spirit of the city and university of Leuven.

The ancient art of citywide musical recitals also still is very much alive. There are regular recitals carried out on the carillon, which was completely restored in 1983 and expanded to 63 bells.

== Regular events ==
- Weekly Farmers' market on Friday
- Yearly cultural city wide exposition Leuven in Scene
- On Saturday and Sunday during the months of July and August, nightly carillon recitals Ladeuze Bells
- Yearly carnival fair during the month of September
- Christmas fair in December
