= Wolfgang de Smet =

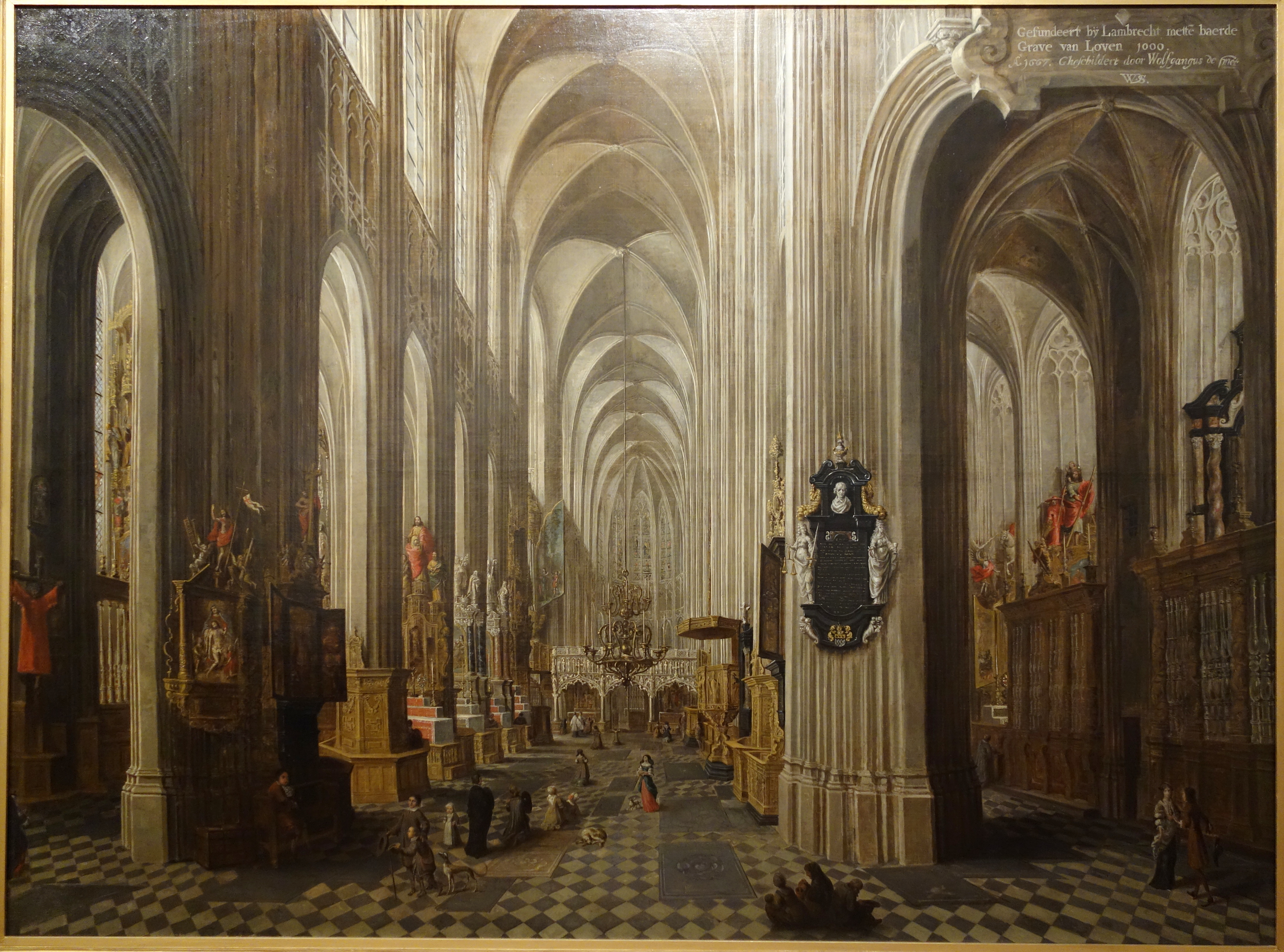
Interior of the St. Peter's Church, Leuven

Wolfgang de Smet (1617–1685) was a Flemish painter, who was active in Leuven in the mid-17th century. He is mainly known for his landscapes, architecture scenes and history paintings.

== Life ==
Hardly anything is known with certainty about this painter whose earliest and latest known paintings are dated respectively 1640 and 1667. He was likely born in Leuven in 1617. His father was Hendrik de Smet, a history and portrait painter born in Leuven c. 1575. Hendrik de Smet became the city painter ('stadtsmeesterschilder') of Leuven in 1627. This position carried with it the responsibility for the decoration of the procession that was held each year on the first Sunday of the kermesse. Hendrik de Smet had various pupils including his son Wolfgang. Wolfgang is known to have worked with his father in 1637.

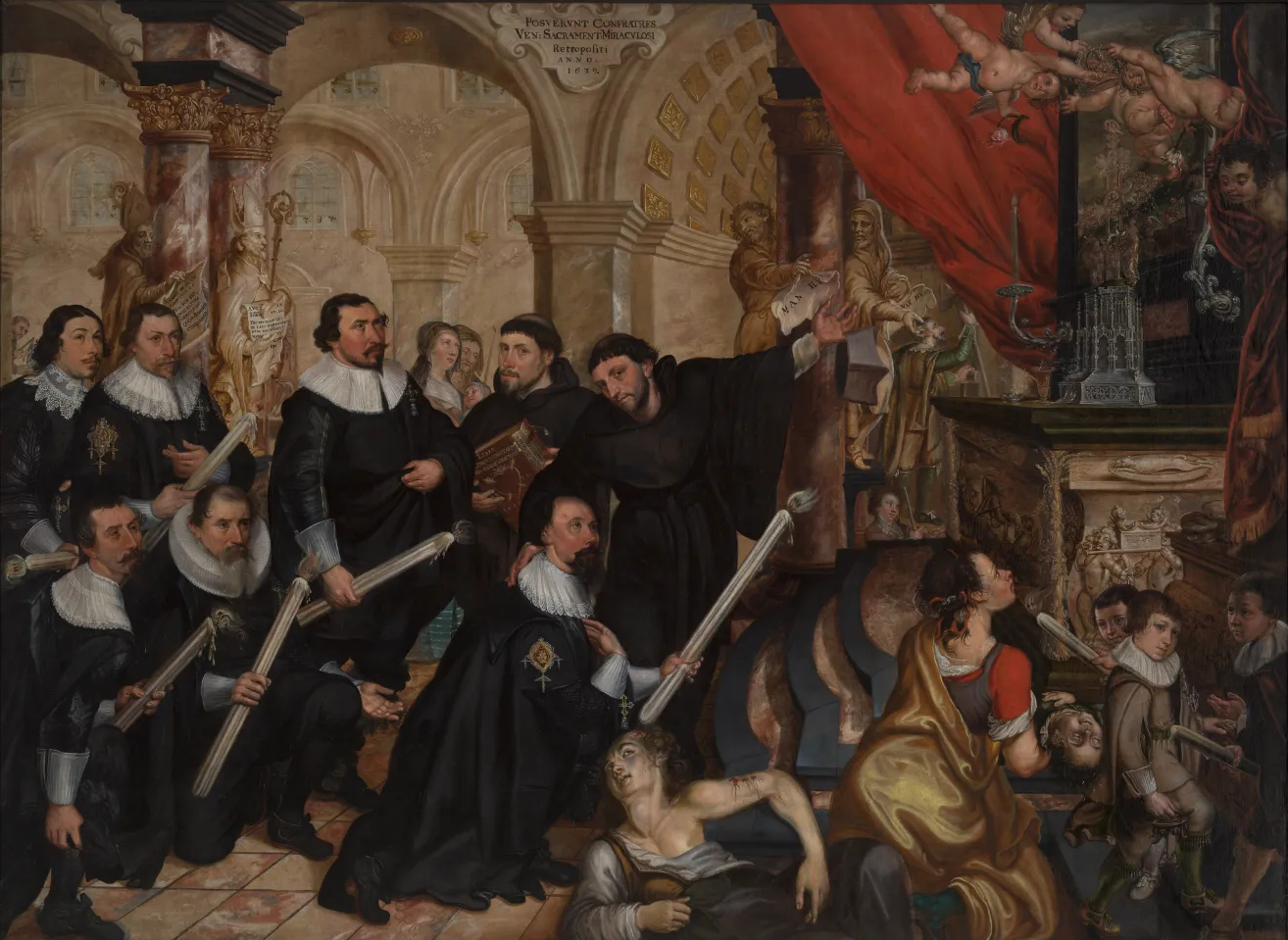
Miracle of the Holy Sacrament (1640)

Wolfgang de Smet married Anna Stockelis in 1670. The couple had various children among whom a son born in 1651 was named after his father. His son named Hendrik, born in 1655, was also a painter.

He was active in Leuven where he likely died in 1685.

== Work ==
Currently, only three paintings are attributed with a certain level of certainty to Wolfgang de Smet. The three paintings are part of the collection of M - Museum Leuven. The large Miracle of the Holy Sacrament dated 1640 represents many persons dressed in period dress who witness the miracle of the Holy Sacrament in a church with a rich Renaissance interior. The representation is characterized by its lavish detail.

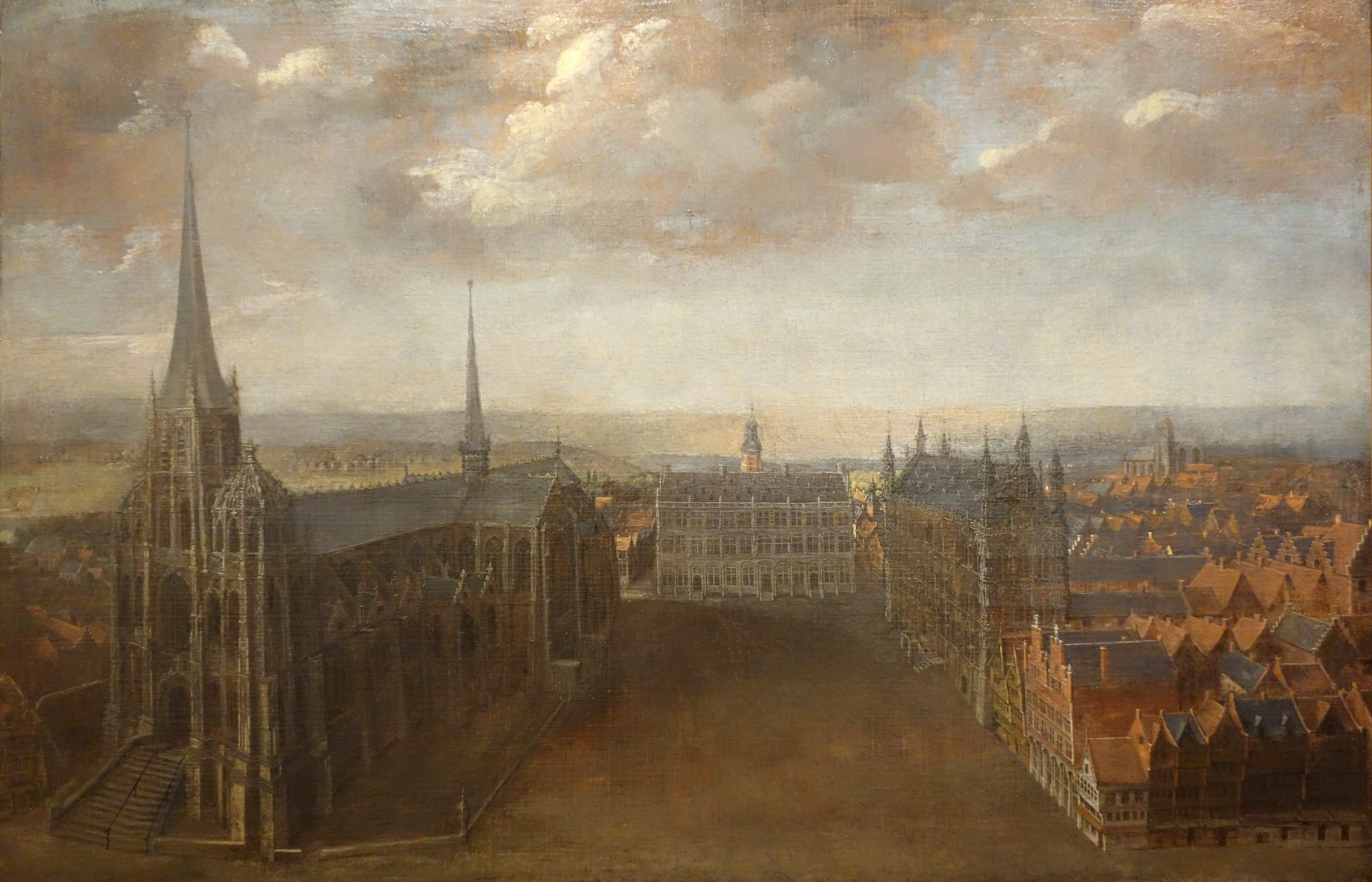
View of the Great Market Square in Leuven

The second painting dated between 1665 and 1667 represents a bird-eye view of the city centre of Leuven with details of the City Hall, the St. Peter's Church and the Great Market Square of Leuven. It includes some details of the church that were never built but only designed.

The last known painting dated 1667 depicts the interior of the St. Peter's Church of Leuven in very great detail. It is an important record of the rich interior decoration of the church in the 17th century. It shows that almost every spot of the church was used and that all the chapels and pillars were covered with religious works of art and objects of worship.

His work shows similarity with that of the painter of church interiors Hendrik van Steenwijk II. His works reveal a good understanding of perspective and colouring. The figures are painted with dynamism and expression.
