= Leuven Town Hall =

Historic building in Leuven, Belgium

- Stadhuis van Leuven (Dutch)
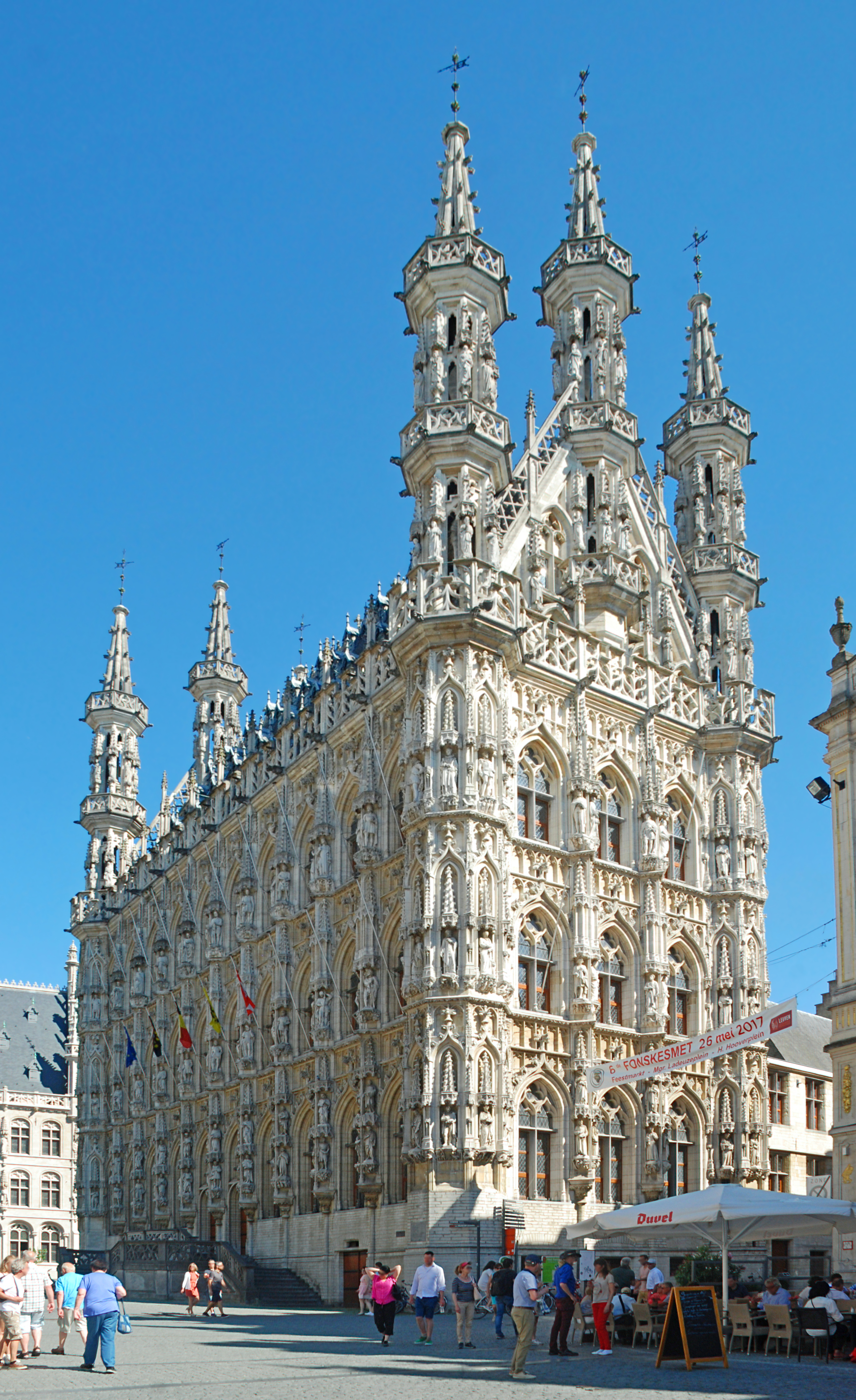
- Leuven's Town Hall seen from the Grote Markt
- Interactive map of the Leuven Town Hall area

General information
- Type: Town hall
- Architectural style: Gothic; Brabantine Gothic
- Location: Grote Markt, Leuven, Flemish Brabant, Belgium
- Coordinates: 50°52′44″N 4°42′4″E

The Town Hall (Dutch: Stadhuis) of Leuven, Flemish Brabant, Belgium, is a landmark building on that city's Grote Markt (main square), across from the monumental St. Peter's Church. Built in a Brabantine late-Gothic style between 1439 and 1469, it is famous for its ornate architecture, crafted in lace-like detail.

== History ==
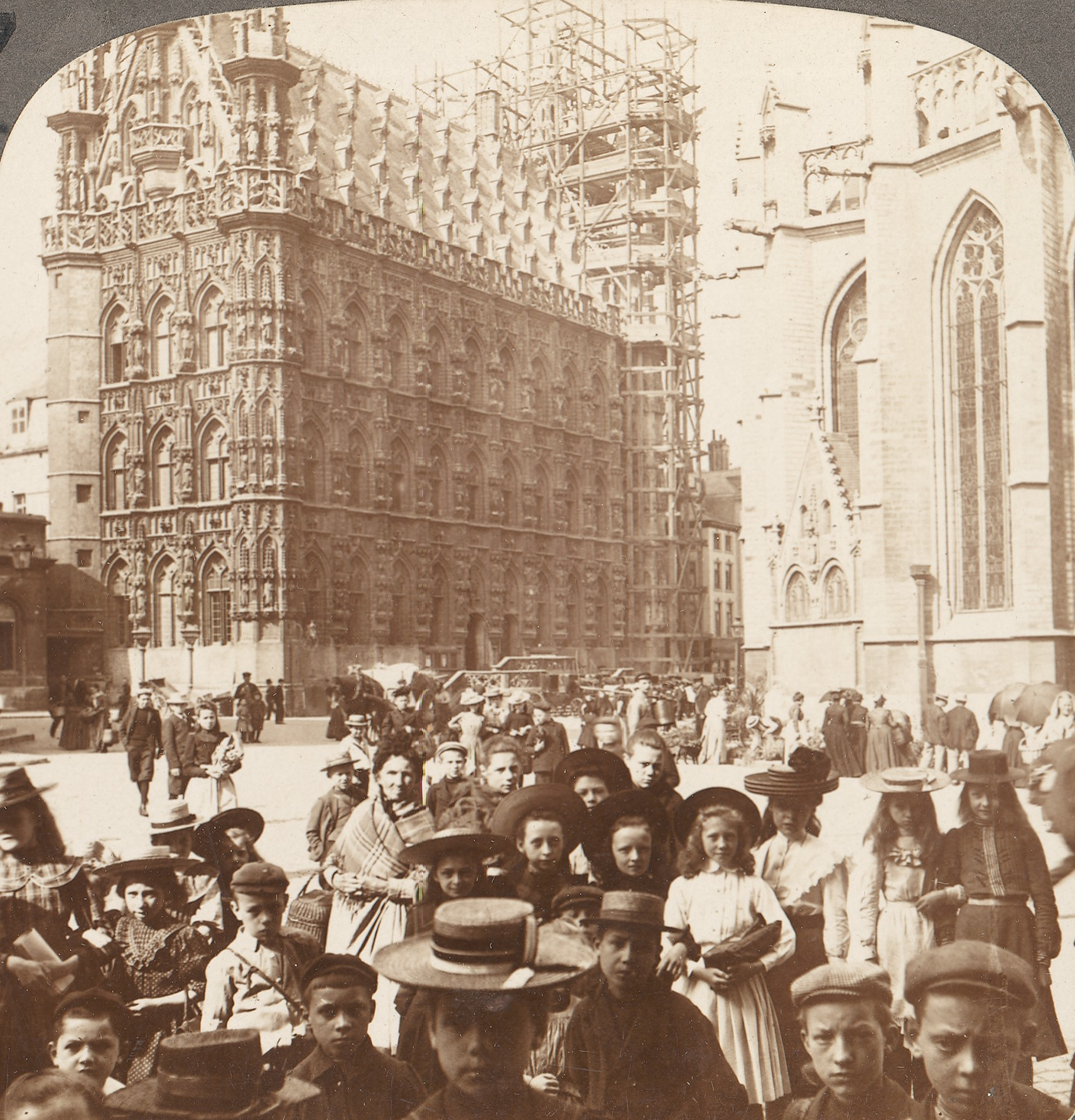
Leuven's Town Hall in the late 19th century

The building today known as the Town Hall was the Voirste Huys (front house) of a larger complex of municipal buildings on which construction started in 1439 at the site of an existing Town Hall. The first architect, Sulpitius Van Vorst, died soon after the rear wings of the complex got started and was succeeded briefly by Jan Keldermans II, whose death in 1445 ended the first construction campaign.

The project resumed in 1448 under the direction of Matheus de Layens. The first stone of the Voirste Huys was laid on 28 March of that year. The cellars of some demolished houses were incorporated into the new construction and can be accessed today through a small door at the left side of the Town Hall. The initial plans, influenced by Brussels' Town Hall, included a belfry tower at one of the corners. This design was modified by de Layens, resulting in the symmetrical arrangement of turrets observed today. The exterior masonry and roof were finished in 1460, and in 1469, the building was complete.

In the 19th century, the Town Hall underwent renovations made necessary by centuries' worth of decay. The building remained standing amid the devastation of Leuven during World War I, escaping with only minor damage. In World War II, a bomb strike in front of the building caused yet more damage; it took until 1983 before repairs were completed.

== The building ==
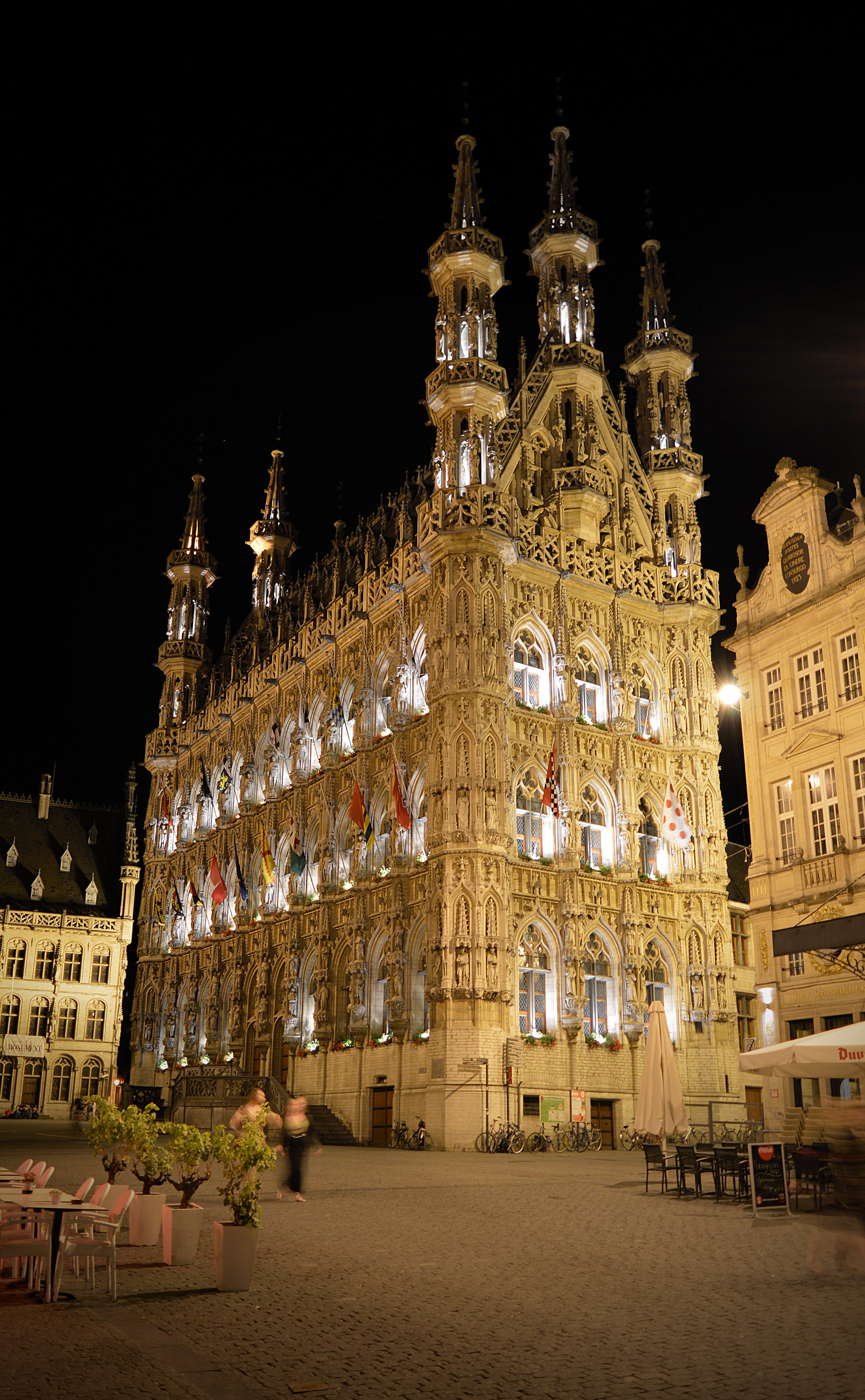
The Town Hall by night

The Town Hall has three main stories, lined with pointed Gothic windows on the three sides visible from the Grote Markt. Above is a gallery parapet, behind which rises a steep roof studded with four tiers of dormers. At the angles of the roof are octagonal turrets pierced with slits allowing for the passage of light.

Statues in canopied niches are distributed all over the building. The corbels supporting the statues are carved with Biblical scenes in high relief. While the niches and corbels are original with the building, the 236 statues themselves are relatively recent, dating from after 1850. Those of the first floor represent personages of importance in the city's local history; those of the second, patron saints and symbolic figures; those of the third, the Counts of Leuven and Dukes of Brabant from various ages.

The main façade has an entrance staircase, and two portals in the centre, above which are figures of Saint Peter (left) and the Madonna and Child (right), the former in compliment to the patron of the church opposite.

The interior accommodates an interesting collection of artwork, including sculptures by Constantin Meunier and Jef Lambeaux. Inside can also be seen the portraits of the Leuven mayors since 1794.

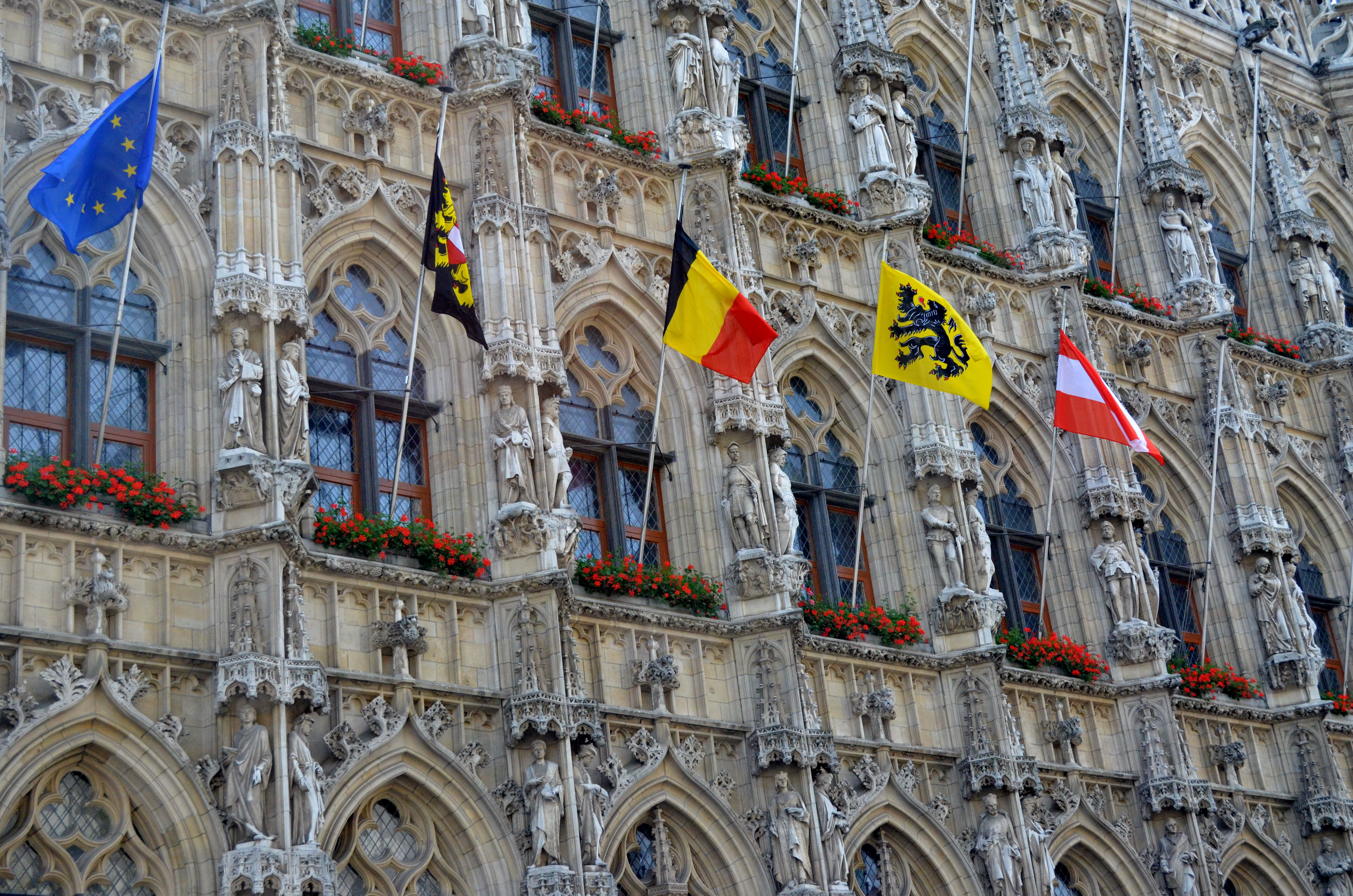
Details of the heavily ornamented facade

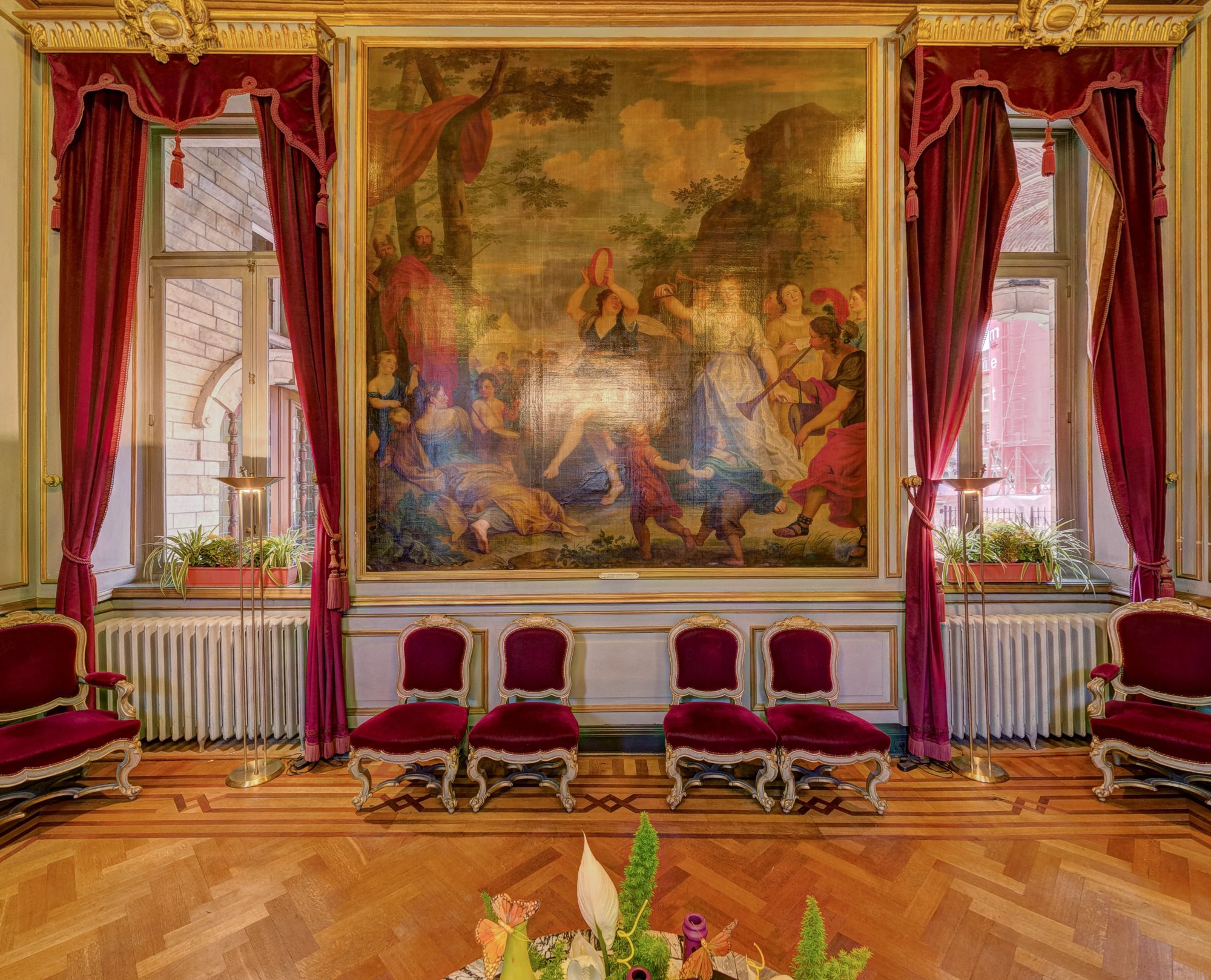
Wedding Room

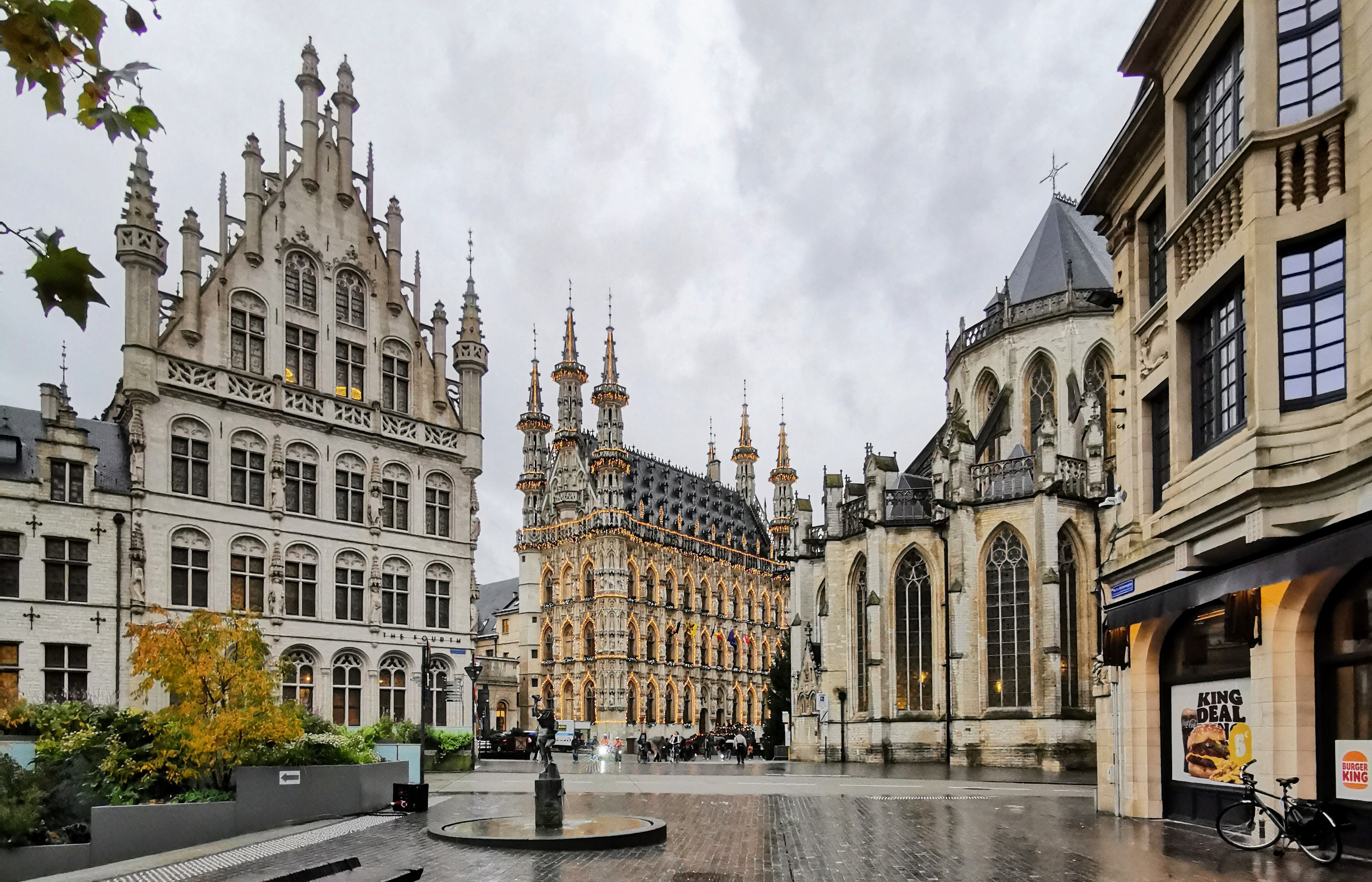
Historic Town Hall and Saint Peter's Church

== See also ==
- Belgium in "the long nineteenth century"
