= Verrebroek =

- Village
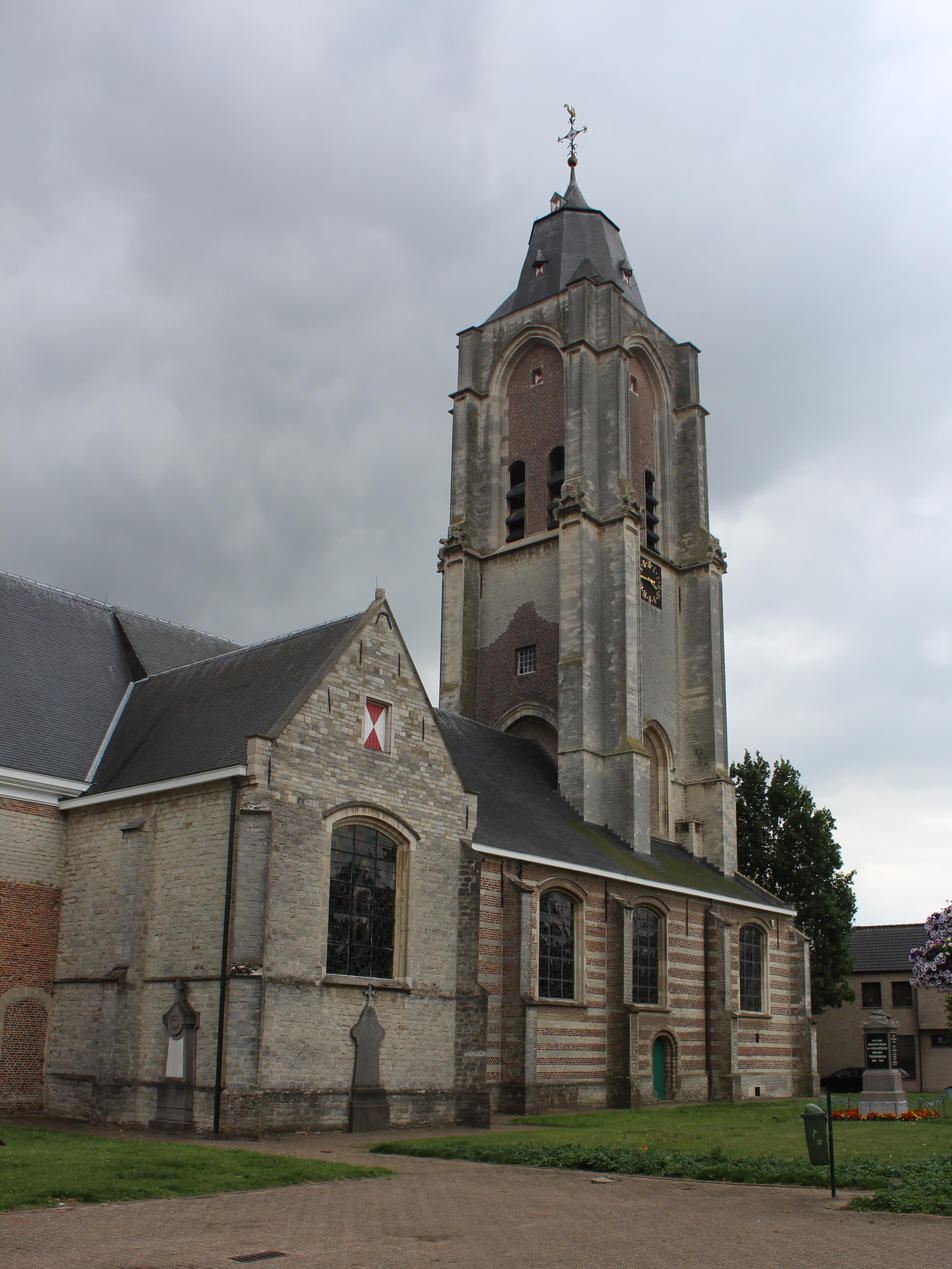
- Saint Laurens Church

- Seal

- Location in Belgium
- Coordinates: 51°15′19″N 4°11′19″E
- Country: Belgium
- Region: Flemish Region
- Province: East Flanders
- Municipality: Beveren

Area
  - Total: 15.97 km^{2} (6.17 sq mi)

Population (2021)
  - Total: 2,033
  - Density: 127.3/km^{2} (329.7/sq mi)
- Time zone: CET

Verrebroek is a village and deelgemeente in the municipality of Beveren in East Flanders, Belgium. Verrebroek was an independent municipality until 1 January 1977, when it merged with Beveren as part of the fusion of municipalities in Belgium.

== History ==
The village was first mentioned in 1141. The monks of the cloister of Salegem developed the region by poldering the swamplands which resulted in the village becoming one of the wealthiest in the Waasland. Warfare between Philip the Good and the inhabitants of Ghent as well as floods halted the development of the village. In 1974, the municipality was home to 1,266 people and covered an area of 15.81 square kilometres (6.10 sq mi). In 1977, the municipality was merged into Beveren. In 1996, the Port of Antwerp was extended by the construction of Verrebroekdok which borders the village.

== Sights ==
Construction of the Saint Laurens Church started in the 15th century, and mainly dates from the 1650s. In 1804, the top half of the spire was replaced by an optical telegraph on the orders of Napoleon. In 1815, after the fall of Napoleon, the telegraph was removed. As a result, the church is colloquially known as Peperbus (pepper caster).

== Notable people ==
- Philip Verheyen (1648–1711), surgeon.

== Gallery ==
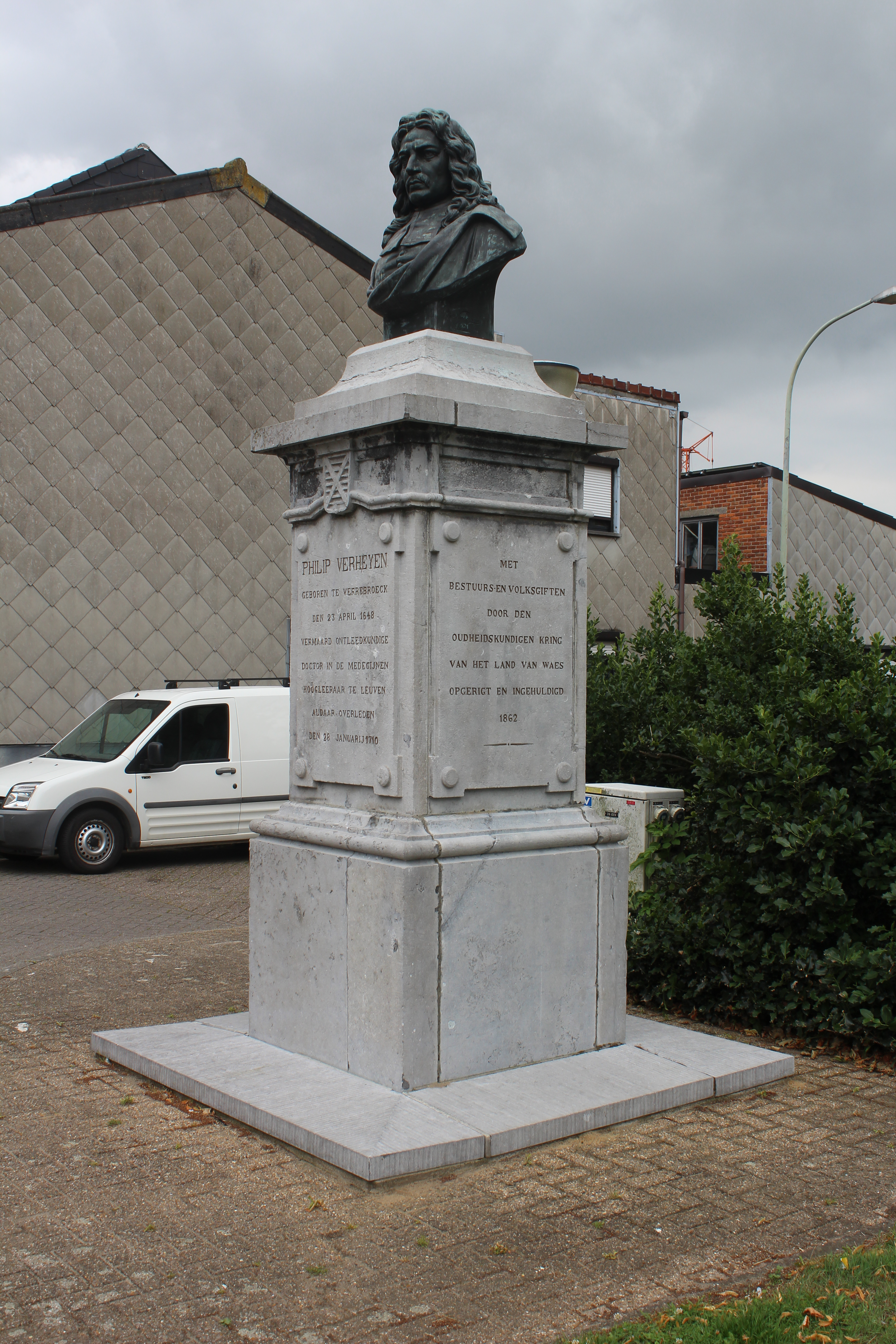
Philip Verheyen memorial

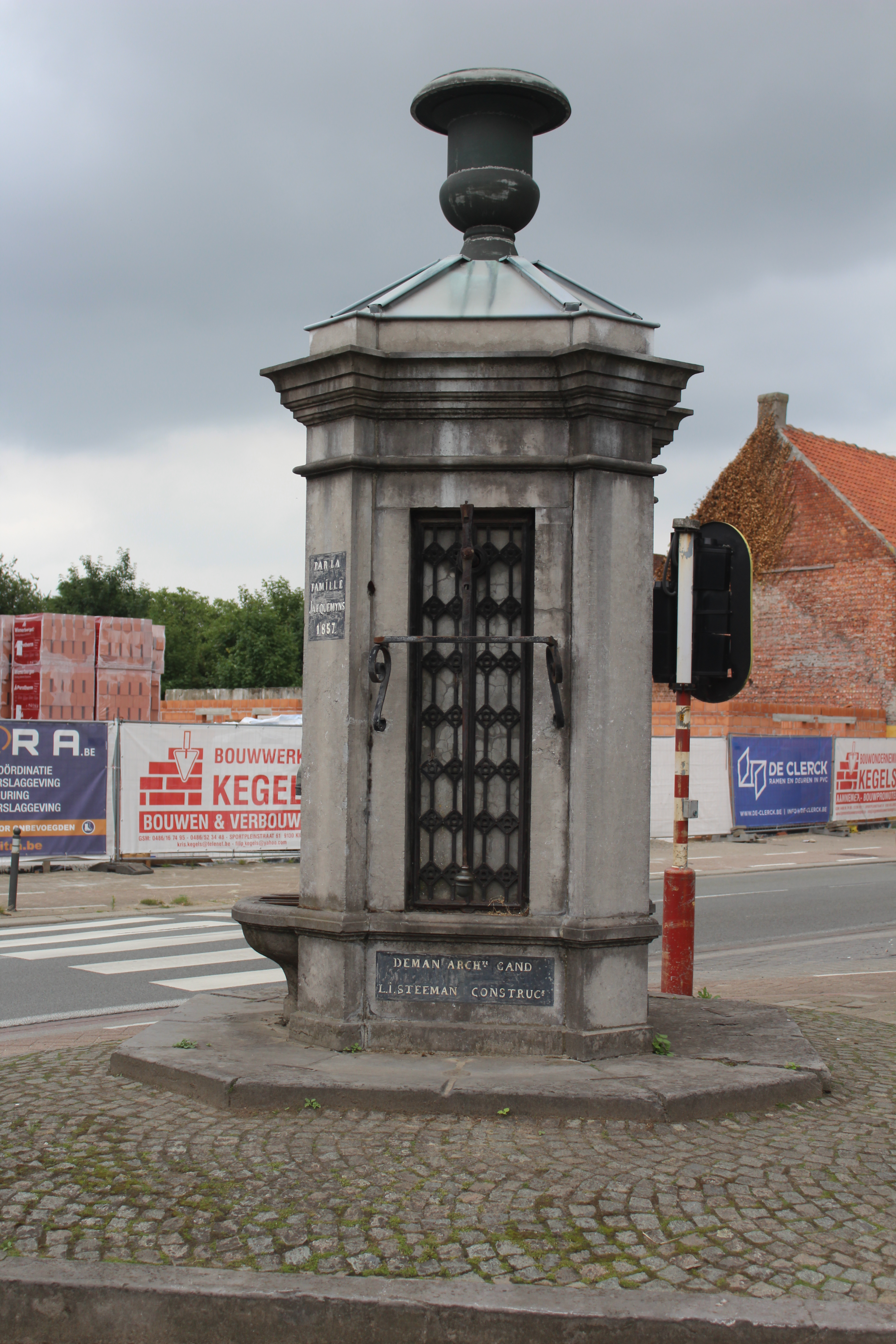
Village pump

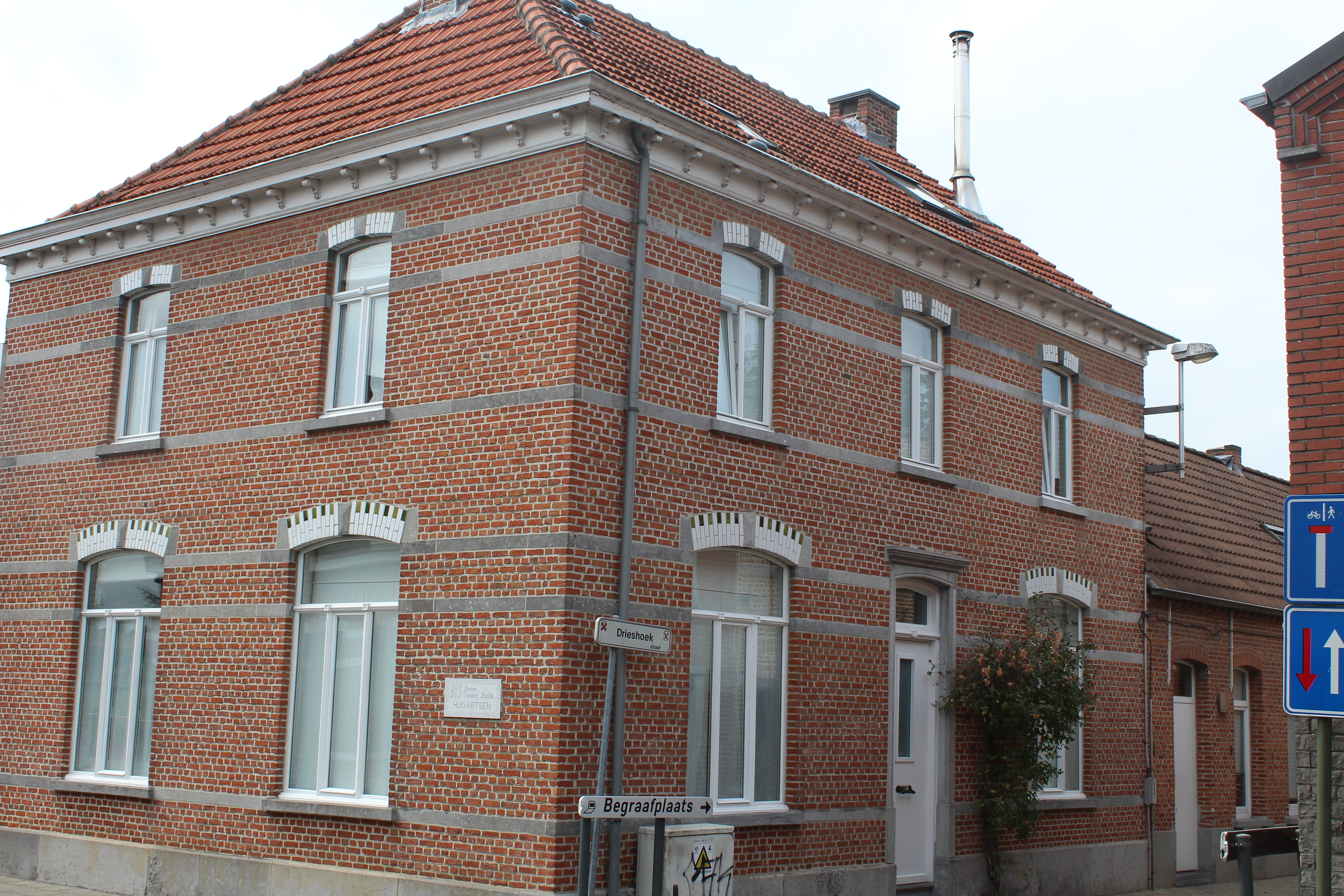
Corner house
