= Philip Verheyen =

Flemish physician

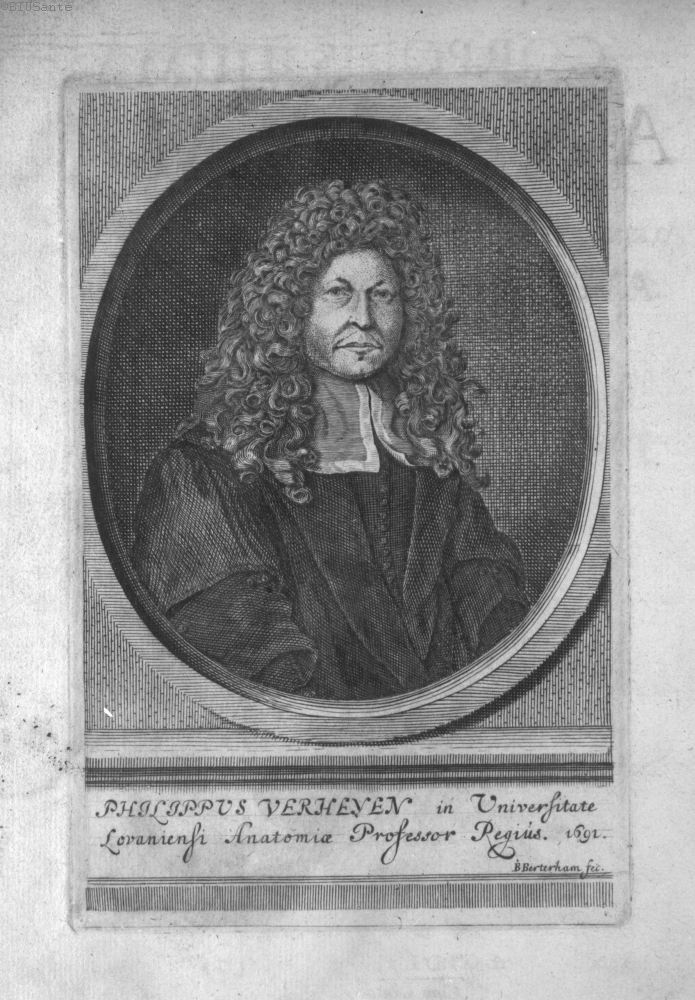
Philip Verheyen, from his work Corporis Humani Anatomia

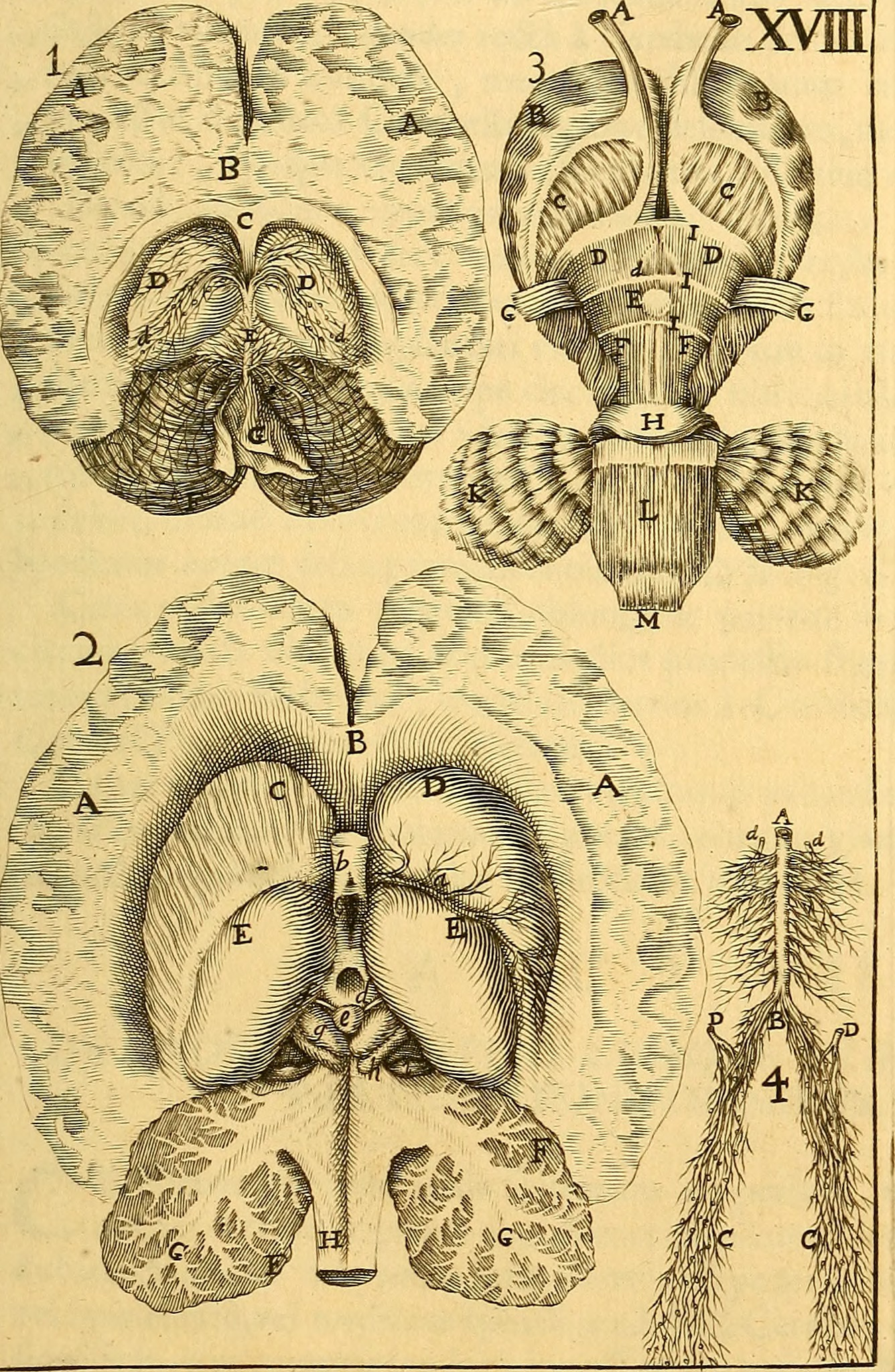
Illustration of Corporis Humani Anatomia

Philip Verheyen (Verrebroek, 23 April 1648 – Leuven, 28 January 1710) was a Flemish surgeon, anatomist and author.

As the third child of seven, Verheyen was born in Verrebroek, in modern Belgium (most likely in his parents' house, standing on a small plot of owned land in the area called "Borring", close to the border with Meerdonk), to Thomas Verheyen and Joanna Goeman. He was baptized in the parish church of Verrebroek on 24 April 1648. Little is known of his childhood. As a young boy he was probably a cowherd, and it is assumed that he learned to read and write at the local parish school. Local folk tales claim that he had such a brilliant memory that he could recite the pastor's sermon after attending mass on Sunday.

The pastor of the village took him under his wing and he was sent to Leuven in 1672 where he spent three years at Trinity College.

Concluding his studies in the liberal arts in 1675 Verheyen went on to study theology with the intention of following in the footsteps of his mentor and joining the clergy to become a priest. It was at this crucial juncture that an illness resulted in the amputation of his left leg rendering him unfit for the clergy. This event proved to be of utmost importance to the subsequent path he chose.

Starting his medical career, he initially pursued studies at Trinity College and then attended Leiden from 1681 to 1683. Returning to Leuven in 1683, he earned his doctorate in medicine. He provided instruction in anatomy and surgery while practicing medicine. As a result of his many publications, in a short period of time he acquired renown both in and outside the country. The year 1693 saw the first publication of his Corporis Humani Anatomia.

Philippe Verheyen died in November 1710 and was buried in the churchyard of the church of St Michael in Leuven. Prior to his death, he had given orders for his body to be buried outside the church so as not to infect the building with "unwholesome vapours".

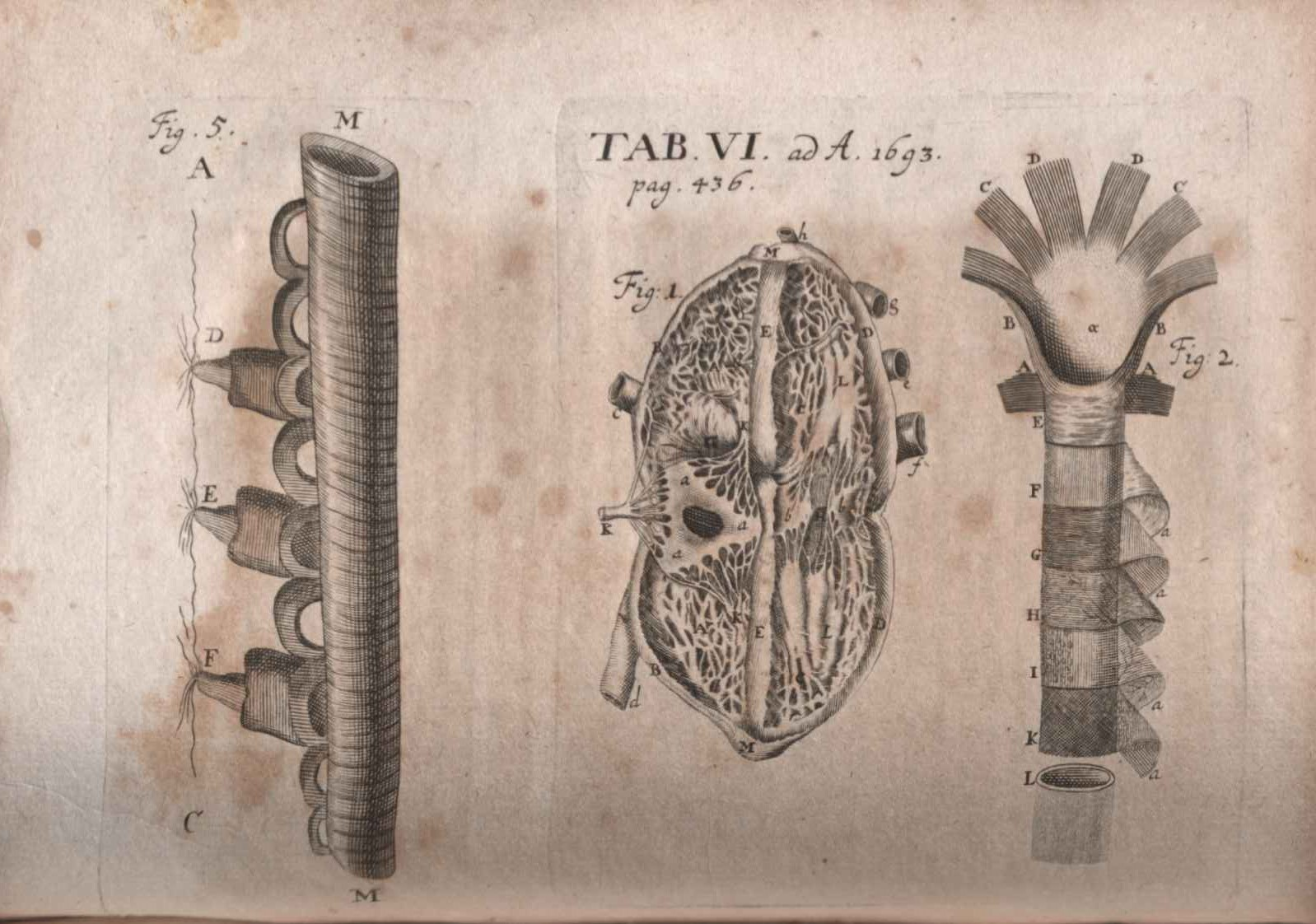
Illustration of critique of Corporis humani anatomia... published in Acta Eruditorum, 1693

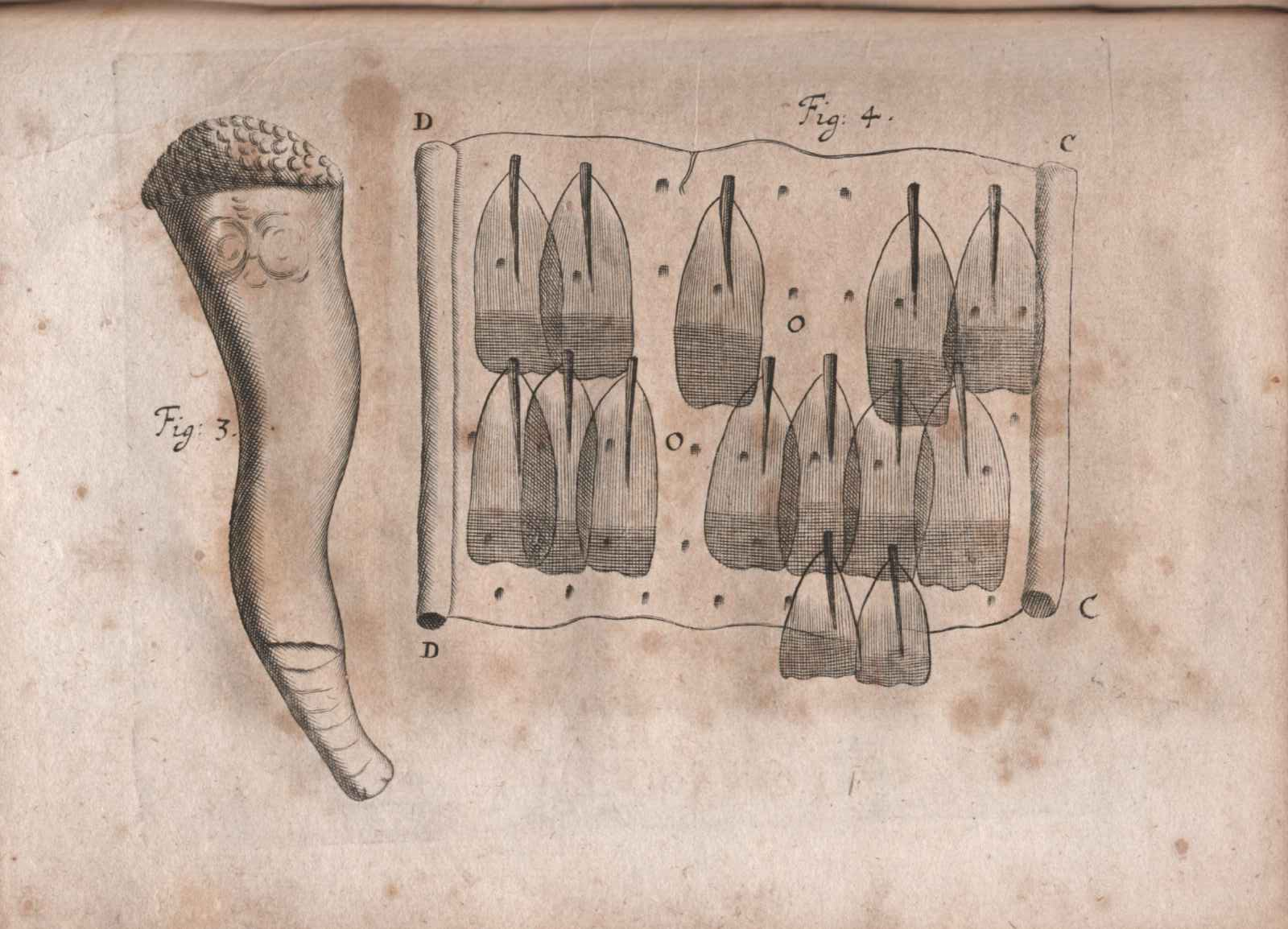
Illustration of critique of Corporis humani anatomia... published in Acta Eruditorum, 1693

In 1862 his native village of Verrebroek held a celebration of his life and achievements.
