= Oude Markt =

Square in Leuven, Belgium

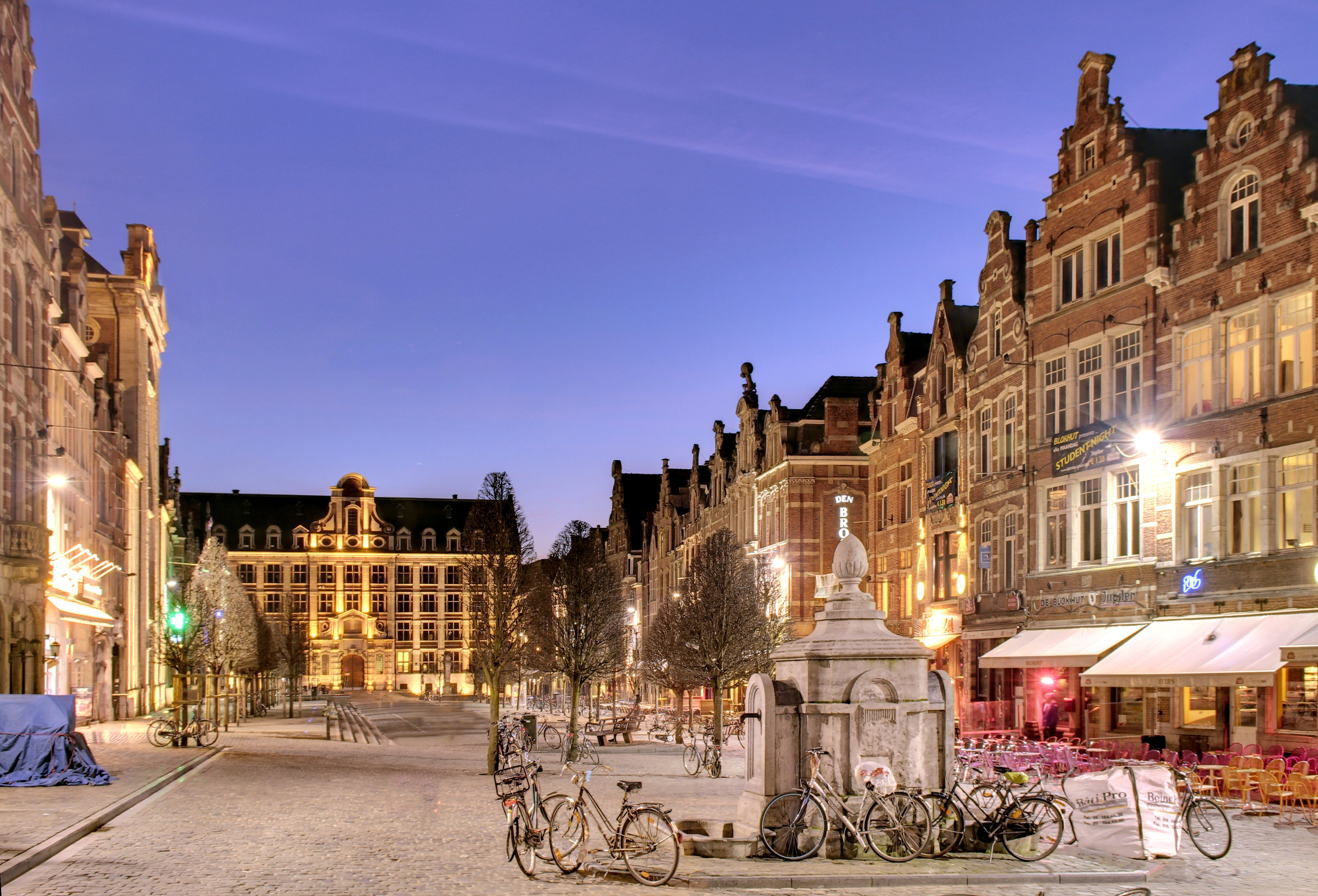
- View of the Oude Markt

- Location within Belgium
- Location: Leuven, Flemish Brabant, Belgium
- Coordinates: 50°52′41″N 4°41′58″E

The Oude Markt (Dutch for "Old Market") is a rectangular square in the centre of Leuven, Flemish Brabant, Belgium, that largely consists of catering establishments. This is why it is nicknamed the "longest bar in the world".

== History and buildings ==
As the historical residence city of the Counts of Leuven, the square was given market rights in 1150, when the first stone ramparts were built, so that economic activities started to develop. A market was held up to three times a week. In the 20th century, parts of the market escaped the bombing of the two world wars, but reconstruction was still necessary.

The cobble-stoned square is encicrcled by many historical buildings, dating from the 18th century to present. The classicist wing of the Old University of Leuven's University Hall also opens on the Oude Markt. The university library was housed there until its destruction in 1914. The facade of the Holy Trinity College is well visible at the southern end of the square. De Kotmadam, a statue from 1985 by the sculptor Fred Bellefroid, is located on the Oude Markt. In addition, the square has two water pumps: the Sint-Janspomp, which is still in function, and the Collegepomp, a relic from 1724.

== Events ==
The Leuven fair is held annually in the first three weeks of September on the Oude Markt, while the Student welcome is held annually at the end of September. There is also Hapje-Tapje (literally: a little snack-a small drink, approximately pronounced in English as hap-yeh, tap-yeh): a gastronomical market with a bartender race, at the beginning of August (first Sunday). Since 1989, the Beleuvenissen, a series of concerts that revolve around a specific theme, is organised every Friday in July.

== Gallery ==
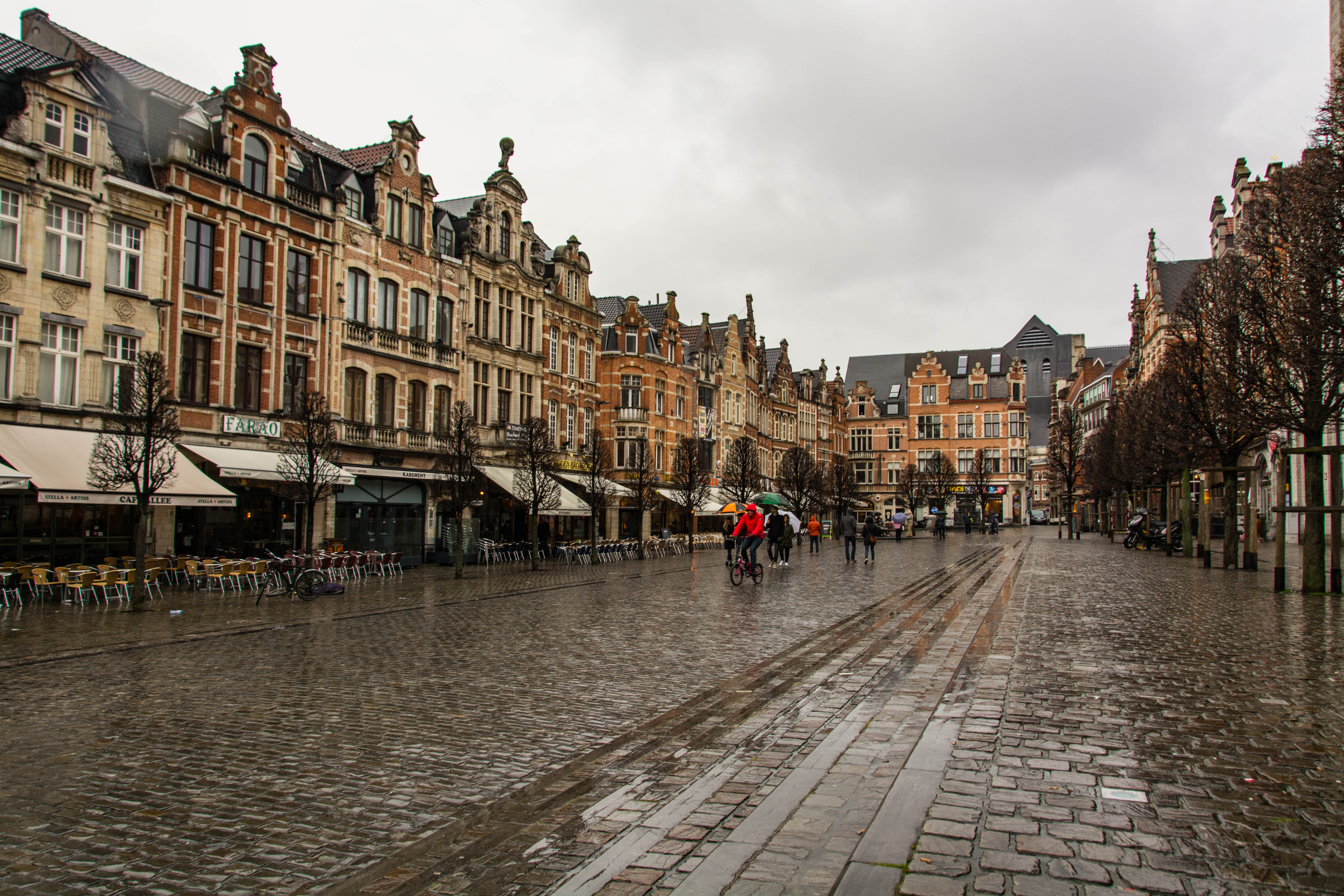
View of the Oude Markt

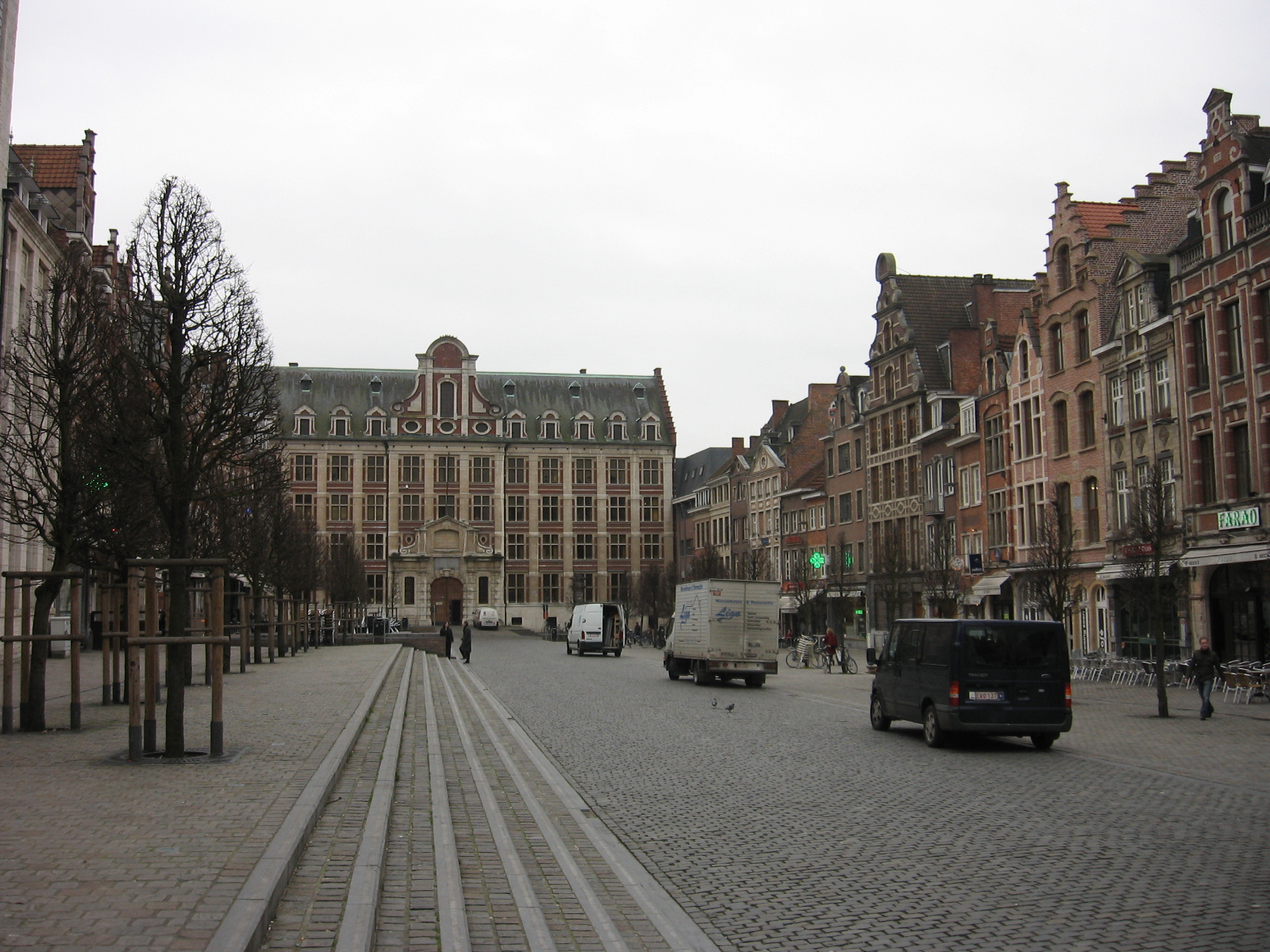
View of the Oude Markt

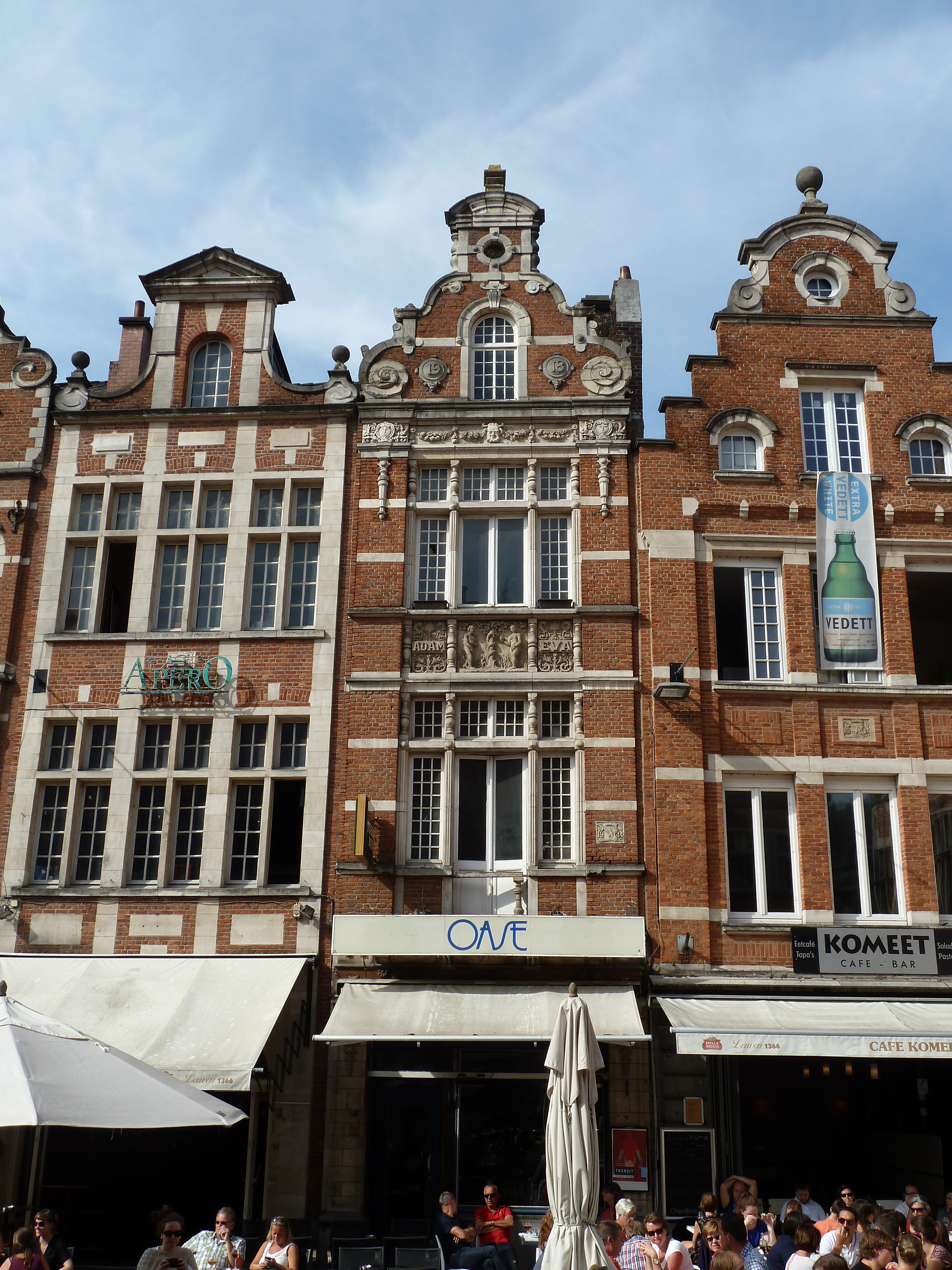
Buildings, to the right: the burgher's house Adam and Eve

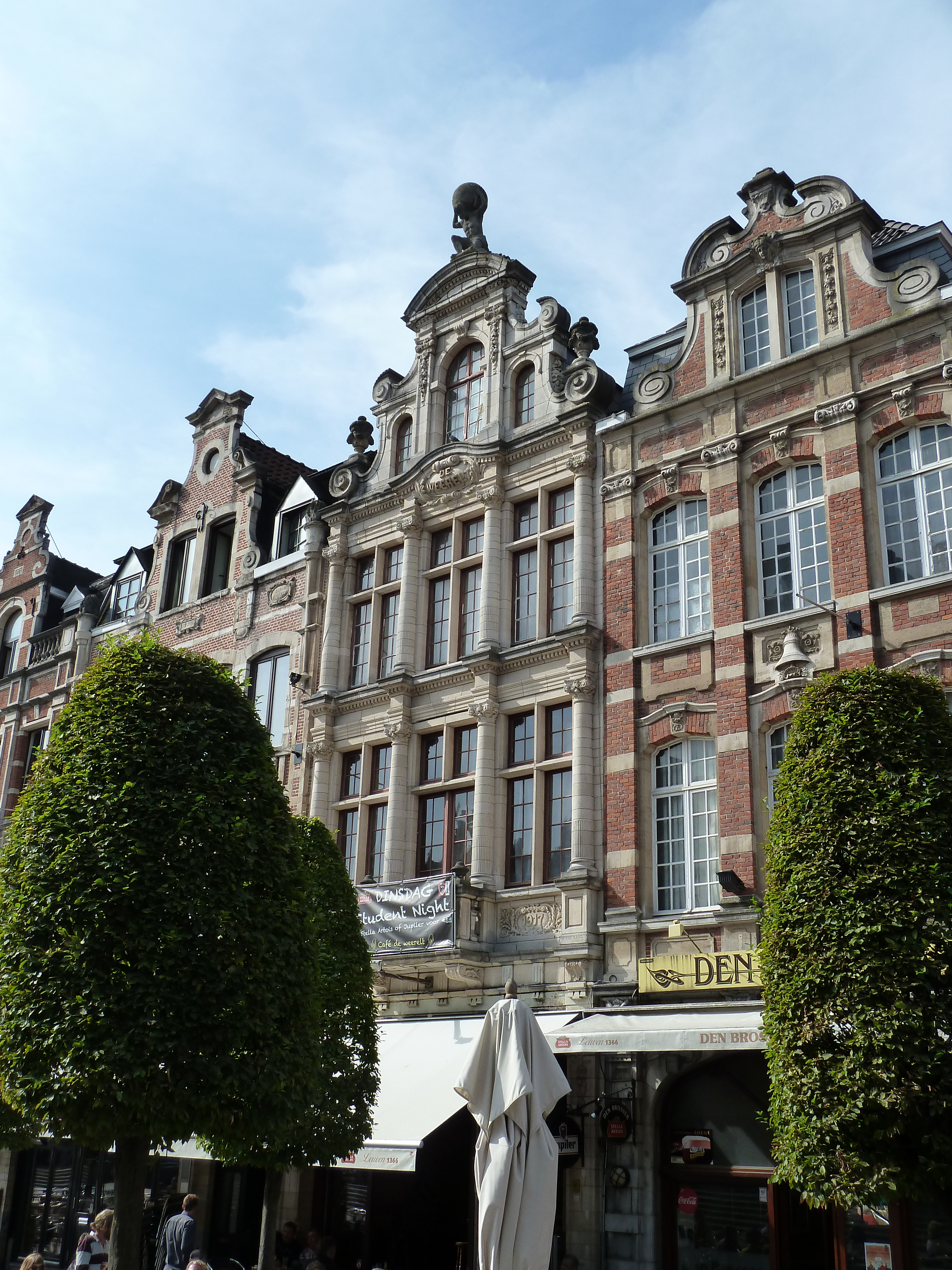
Burgher's house De Weerelt

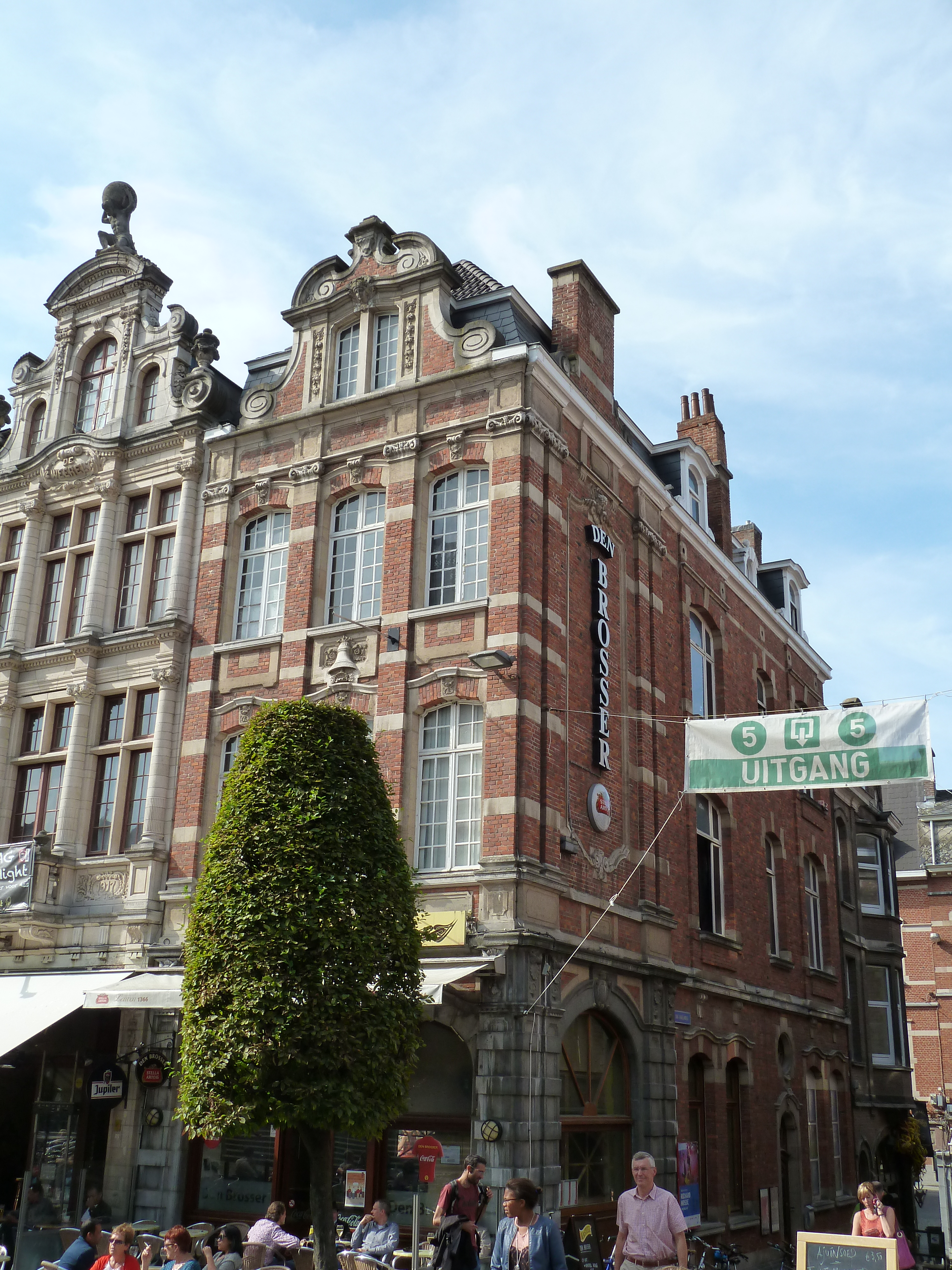
Corner building on the Drie-Engelenberg

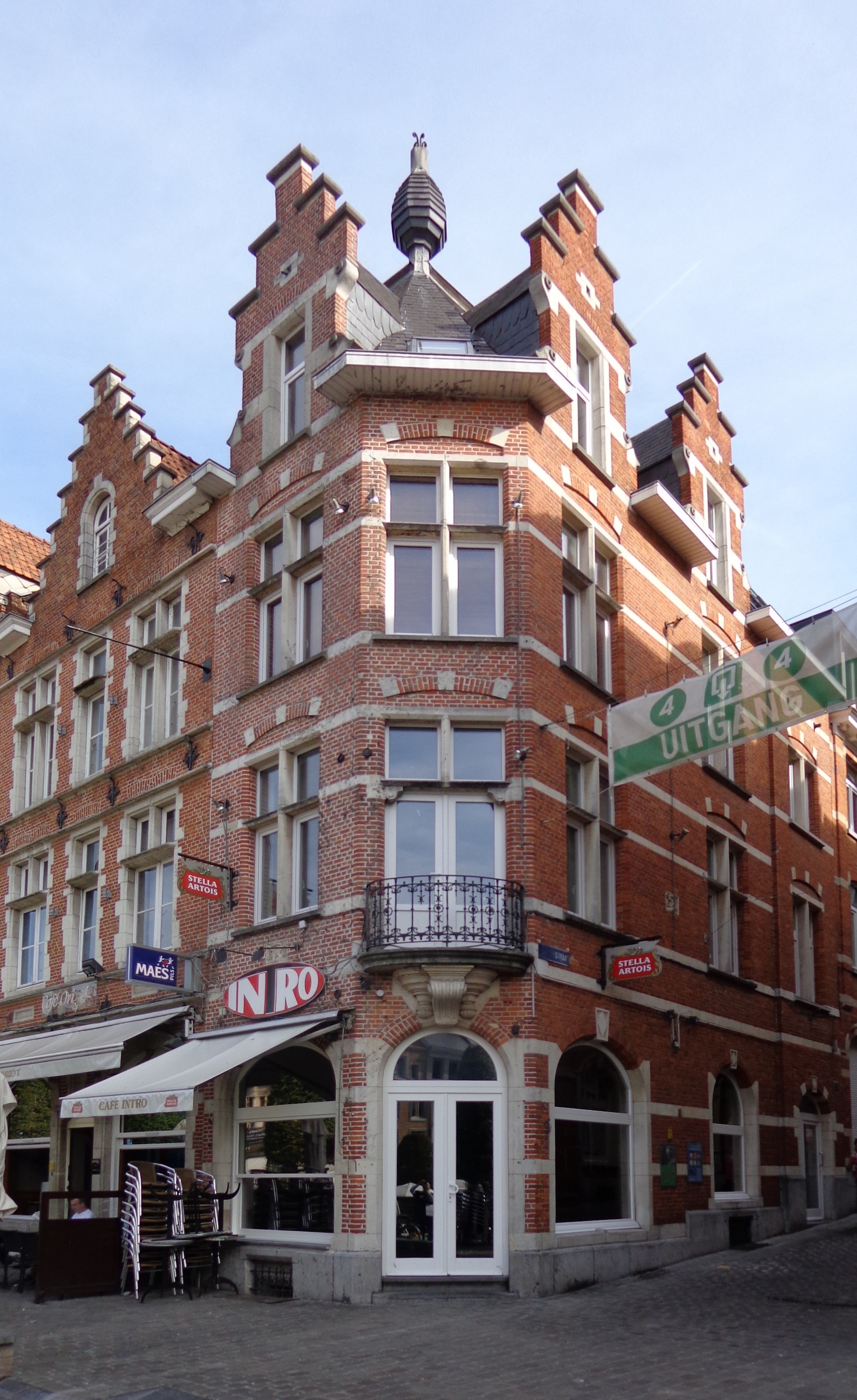
Corner house

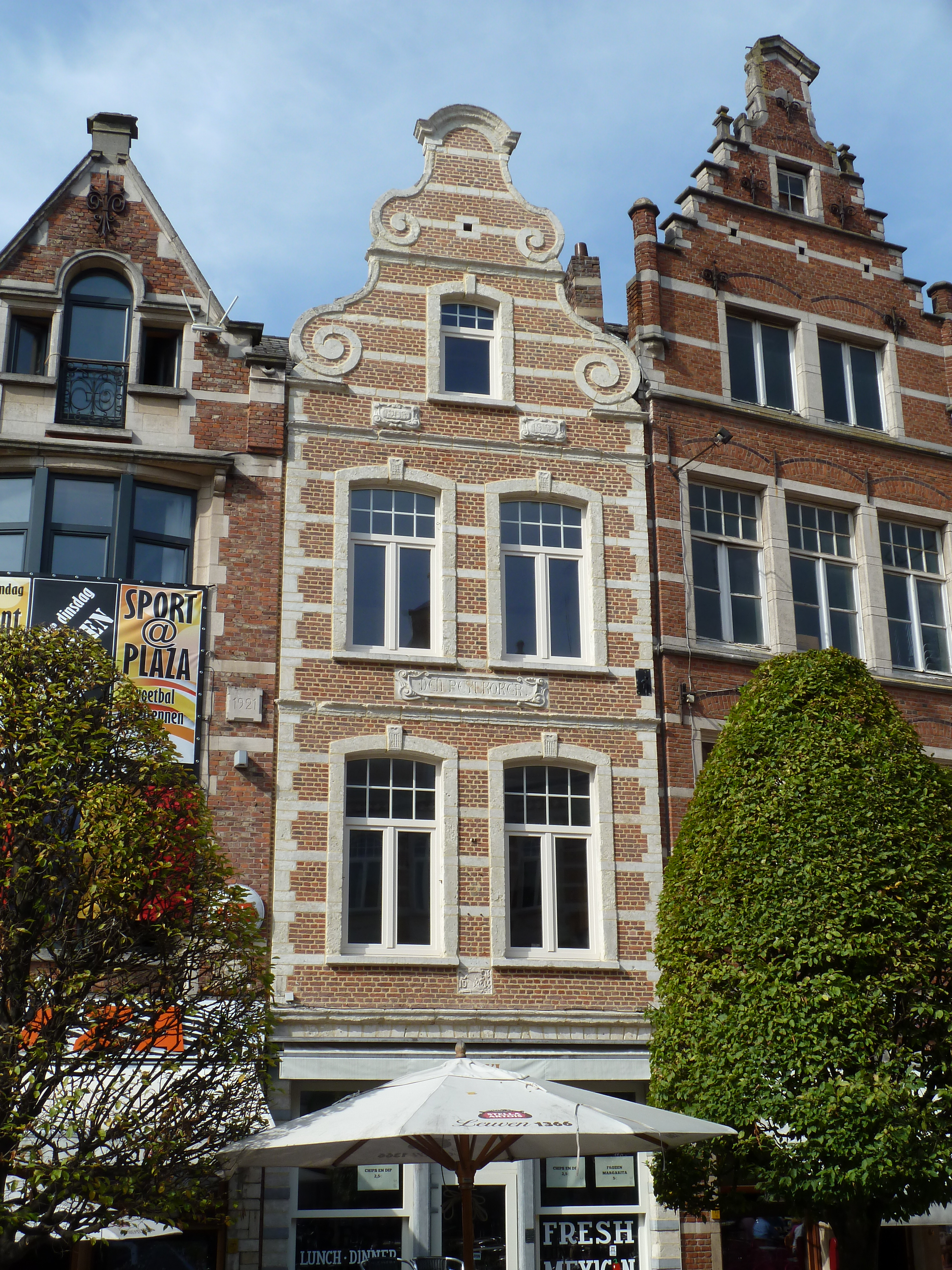
Burgher's house Den Peylkoker

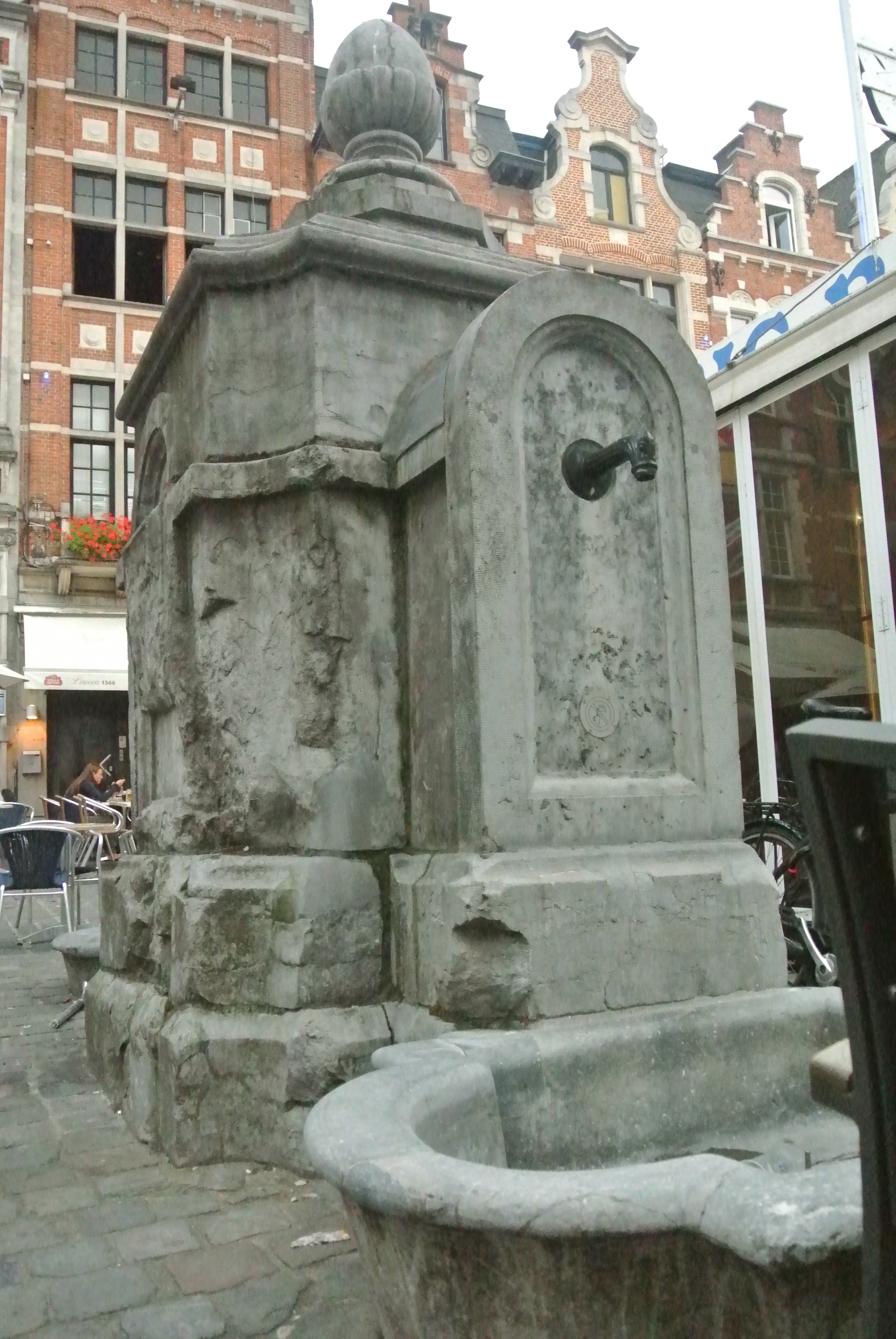
The Sint-Janspomp

== See also ==
- Belgium in the long nineteenth century
