= Trinity College, Leuven =

Trinity College
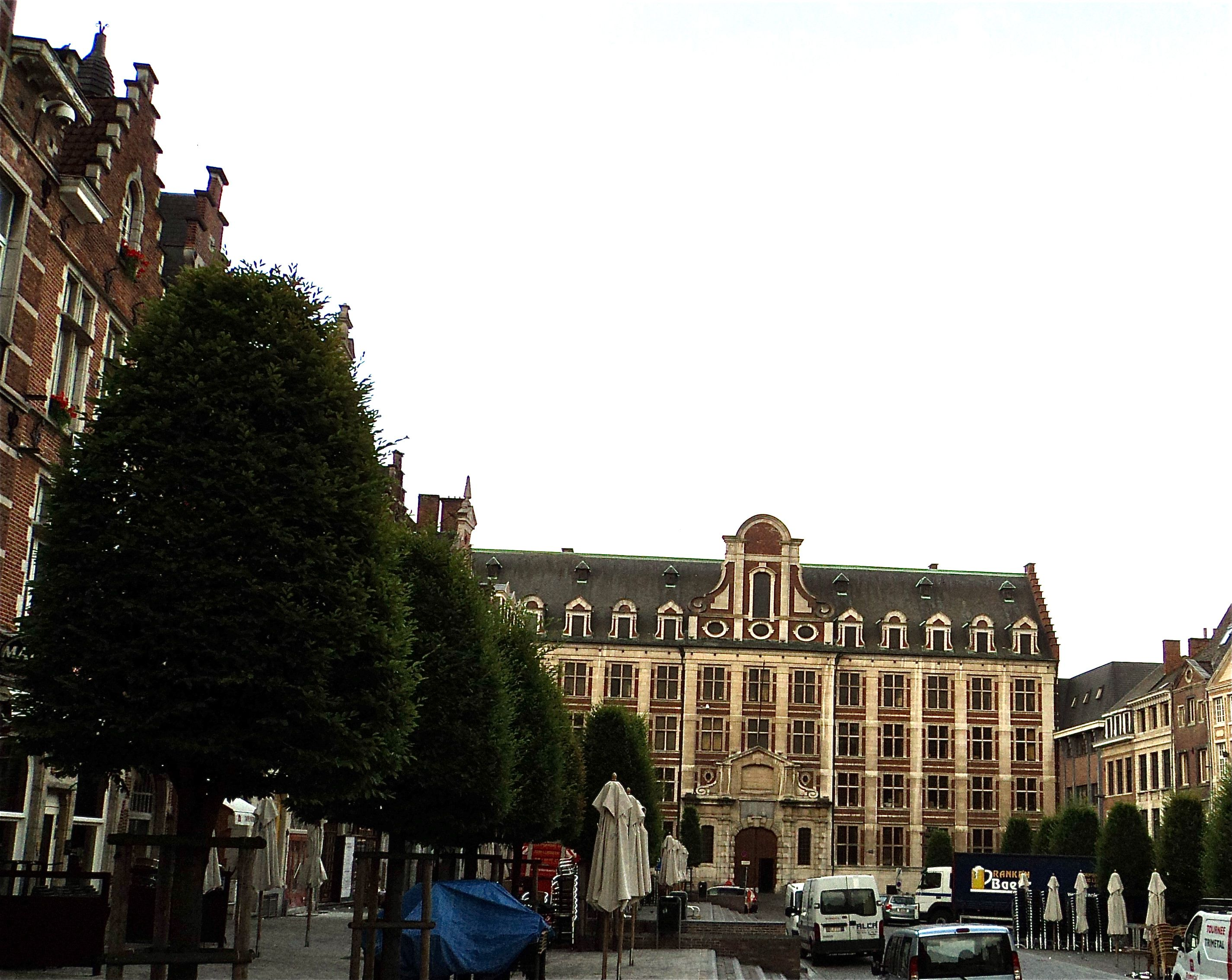
- The secondary school now on the site, replacing the buildings bombed in 1944
- Latin: Collegium SS. Trinitatis
- Type: college
- Active: 1657–1797
- Religious affiliation: Catholic
- Academic affiliation: Old University of Leuven
- Location: Leuven, Belgium; 50°52′37″N 4°41′55″E

Trinity College was one of the colleges of Leuven University, dedicated to preliminary studies in the liberal arts. The college was established by the university authorities in 1657 to replace the "Collège de Gand" founded by Frans van de Nieulande (Franciscus de Nova Terra) in 1559, which had closed in 1655 for lack of funds. Building began in 1658, under the supervision of Jan du Can and Adriaan van Mechelen, and from 1659 the college was housed on the Old Market. It was sometimes known as "Collegium Novum" (New College). The college was sequestered when the university was closed down in 1797 during the French occupation. The buildings were sold at public auction in 1802. The southern wing, added in 1684, was demolished in 1813. The final remnants of the 17th-century buildings were destroyed by aerial bombardment in May 1944. Since 1843 a Josephite secondary-school, Heilige Drievuldigheidscollege, has stood on the location.

== See also ==
- List of colleges of Leuven University
