= Triumphal Cross (Jan Borman) =

The triumphal cross in the Saint Peter's church in Leuven was made between 1490 and 1500 by, presumably, the workshop of the Brussels sculptor Jan Borman. It is even suspected that the figures of Christ, John and Mary were made by the master himself. The chapel in which the triumphal cross is located is the oldest preserved in Leuven, with various but unconfirmed attributions concerning authorship, including Matthijs de Layens, Jan II Borreman, Jan de Messemaker, Hendrik van Evergem.

== Description ==
The figures on the Calvary (the triumphal cross) are very realistic. The balance of expressiveness in draping and nuance in the posture of the figures also leads to the suspicion that it was made by Jan Borman, a well-known and appreciated image cutter. Jesus hangs centrally on the cross. He is howled by John and Mary; their images are attached to the tracery of the cross. Mary turns her face away from the cross, as if she can no longer tolerate the view, but John cannot keep his eyes off it. The two images thus symbolize an important characteristic of late-medieval devotion: the practice of "pity-piety".

At the back of the cross itself there is a medallion of the Lamb of God at the rear. The sculpted hill on which the cross rests represents the Golgotha mountain, complete with bones and skulls. At the bottom the ensemble rests on a wooden supporting structure that is divided into three arcades, each of these arcades contains a figure, these are from left to right: Gregory, Peter and Jerome. The church fathers, Ambrosius, Hendrik and Augustinus, are depicted on the back of this. It is suspected that the painter of this panel was Jan der Coutheren from Leuven.
