= Madonna and Child with Angels (Matsys) =

Painting by Quentin Matsys

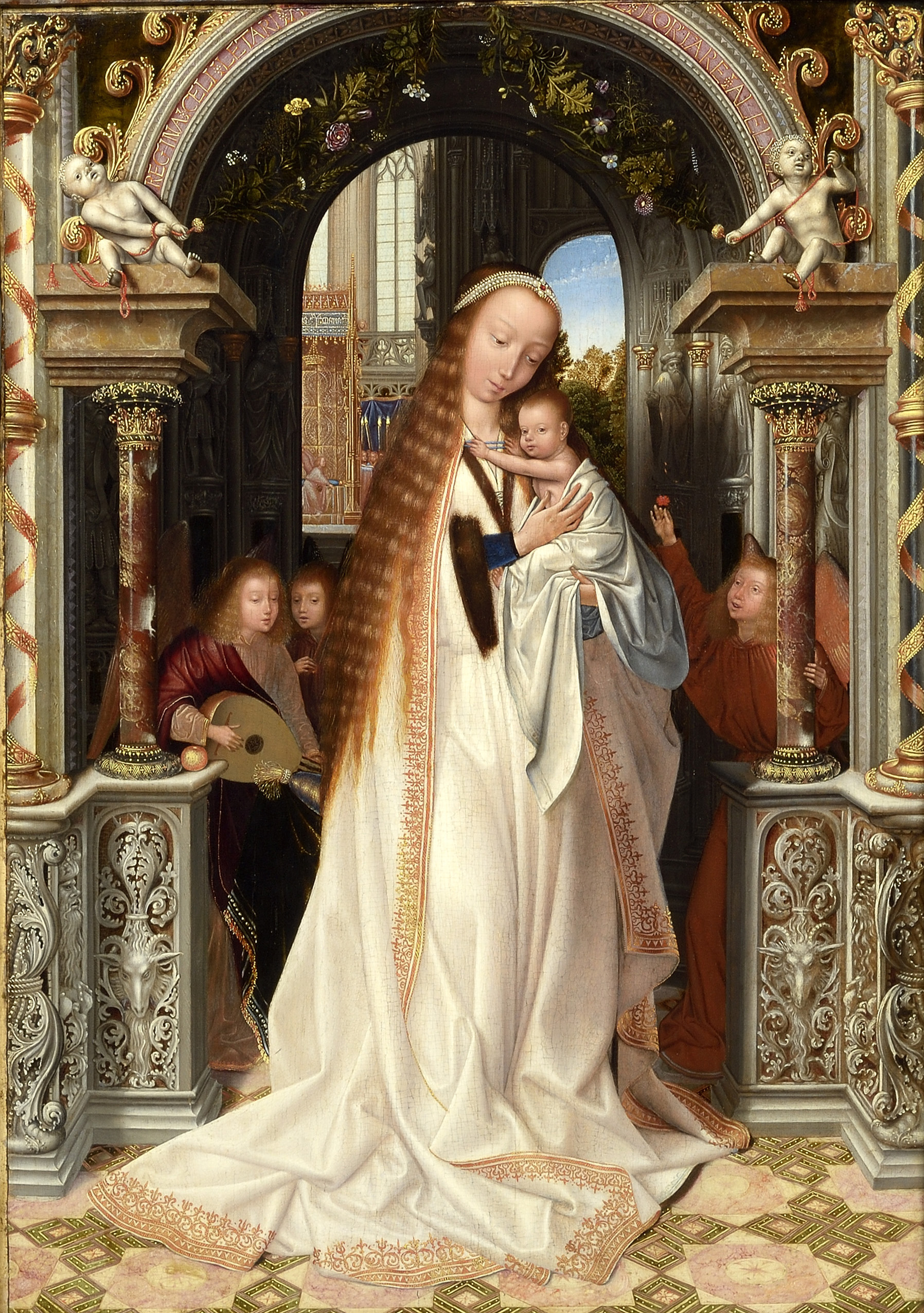
Madonna and Child with Angels (c. 1509) by Quentin Matsys

Madonna and Child with Angels or Madonna and Child Surrounded by Angels is an oil-on-panel triptych painting by Quentin Matsys, executed c. 1509, now in the Museum of Fine Arts of Lyon. The work, which was originally intended for private devotion, seems to echo the art of Jan van Eyck. The Museum of Fine Arts of Lyon acquired it in 1859.

== Description ==
The painting shows the Virgin Mary with long hair, standing under an arch with solid columns of onyx and crystal. She is richly dressed, with her head slightly lowered towards the Baby Jesus that she carries against her, wrapped in a linen which merges with the embroidered white dress of her mother. Two putti frame the scene in the upper part, one seated on the left capital, the other on the right one. Three angels dressed in red are on the ground behind the Virgin, one playing a lute, and another holding up a red carnation. Visible in the background on the left, next to a small patch of blue sky and a few trees, is a very small section of a church whose elements identify it with the old St. Peter's Church, Leuven.

== Sources ==
- http://www.mba-lyon.fr/mba/sections/fr/collections-musee/peintures/oeuvres-peintures/renaissance/quentin-metsys_vierg
