= Sacrament Tower =

Sacrament house in Leuven, Belgium

The sacrament tower of St. Peter's Church in Leuven, Belgium, is a twelve-meter high sacrament house located in the church's choir. Designed by architect Matheus de Laeyens from 1450, it was ordered by the Brotherhood of the holy Sacrament. The tower in St. Peter's Church was built between 1537 and 1539 and this makes it the oldest preserved sacrament tower in Belgium.

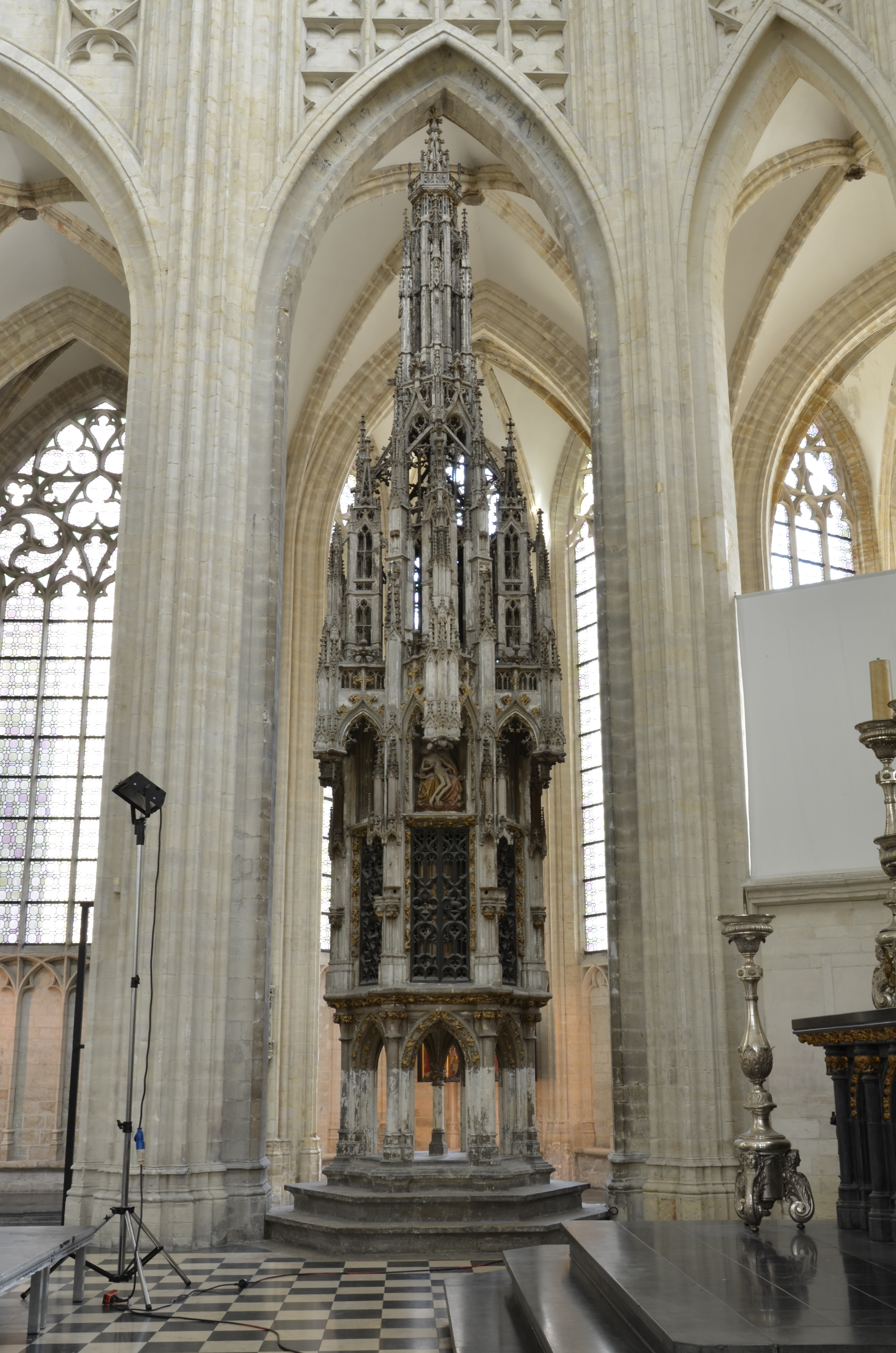
Sacrament Tower of St. Peter's Church, Leuven

== Background ==
Sacrament towers were frequently built from the mid-15th century. These are tabernacles in the shape of a tower, in which the sacred sacrament, a host, was kept. This design was no exception: for this reason doors are provided on the choir side and in the direction of the two northern chapels, which the Brotherhood of the Holy Sacrament was given in 1432 from the chapter of Saint Peter. Sacrament towers became less popular 17th century when the Church decided that the tabernacle should be placed in the center of the altar.

Six others once existed in Leuven, namely in the churches of Sint-Jacob, Saint Quentin (two copies), Park Abbey, Sint-Geertrui Abbey and in the Celestine Monastery in Heverlee. Only the first one still exists. In Flemish Brabant there are still a few sacrament towers from the 16th and 17th centuries that can be seen, especially in Zoutleeuw, Zuurbemde and Diest.

== Description ==
The structure of the sacrament tower consists of an open landing as a base, with the actual tabernacle above it and then reliefs with the passion of Christ and finally a richly elaborated tower crown. Six niches on the third level crown the sides of the tabernacle. It contained reliefs depicting passion scenes, but all but one were lost, just like the apostle figures who stood around the tabernacle. These statues were placed back during a restoration of the tower. The only remaining original fragment is the Grace Chair, in which a throning God the Father supports the dead body of his Son. The theme of the mercy seat is represented three more times in St. Peter's Church, namely on the back of the right side panel of the Edelheeretriptiek (1443), and in the burial monuments of Michaël Scribaens (circa 1504) and Adolf van Baussele (circa 1559).

The actual tabernacle occupies the second floor and is enclosed by panels with tracery and Eucharistic symbols (chalice and lamb). The twelve apostles are depicted in the niches on the corner supports: they were witnesses to the establishment of the sacrament of the Eucharist.
