= Paep Thoon =

Popular figure in 15th century Netherlands

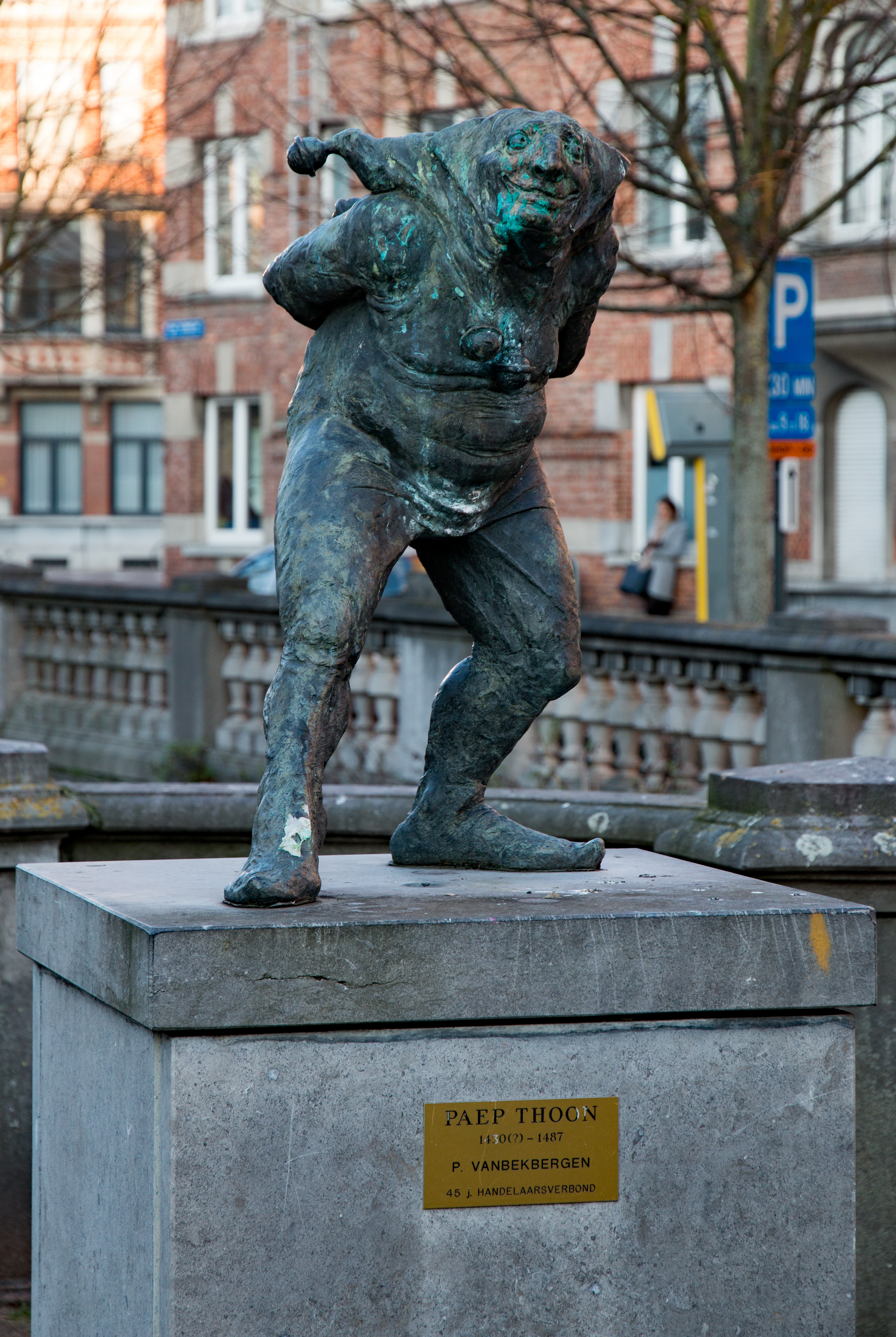
Paep Thoon with jester's hat, statue in Leuven

Paep(e) Thoon (Leuven, 15th century) was a popular figure in Leuven, in the Burgundian Netherlands during the Middle Ages. Numerous stories circulated about him. He has a statue in Leuven.

== Name ==
His real name was Anthoon vander Phalizen or, in Latin, Antonius Phalesius. The name Paep refers to the fact that he was a priest's child; the name Thoon refers to his first name Anthoon.

== Lifecycle ==
Thoon was a natural child of Jan vander Phalizen, pastor of St. Peter's Church in Leuven. Thoon lived in the 15th century; the only date known is the year 1434 in which his father paid him an annual annuity. Thoon may have been hunchbacked. Thoon was organist and carilloneur in St. Peter's Church. He became known for the jokes and pranks he played in the city. When it became too much, a judge in Leuven sentenced him to exile in Liège. Thoon was never allowed to set foot on Leuven soil again.

Sometime later Paep returned from Liège riding in a cart with his feet completely covered in mud. Many people came to see the spectacle, wondering what would happen. It was then that Paep declared that his feet were covered in mud from Luik and that he was technically not setting foot on Leuven soil. The judge, possibly too busy for this kind of stuff, conceded and let Paep live in Leuven as a jester. Many stories follow this event, mostly about how he mocked the academics of the university.

Thoon wished to be buried, standing, with his mouth under a gargoyle of St. Peter's Church. That way he would never be thirsty. In fact, no one knows where he was buried.

== Statue ==
In 1961, the city of Leuven placed a bronze statue by Paep Thoon in the Brusselsestraat, on an arm of the Dyle. Peter Vanbekbergen was the sculptor.
