= Saint Waltrude Collegiate Church =

- Collégiale Sainte-Waudru (French)
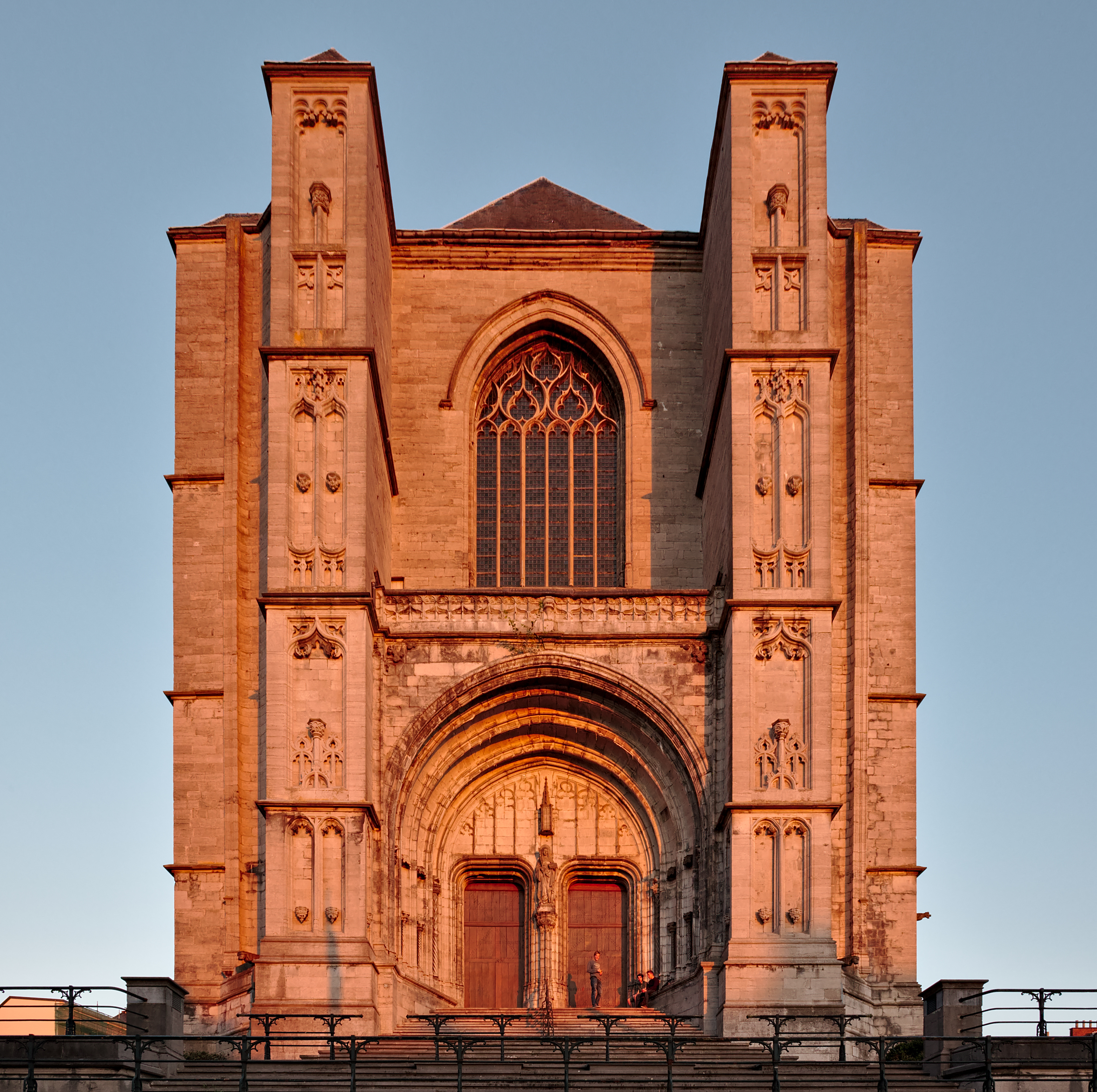
- West facade
- Saint Waltrude Collegiate Church
- 50°27′12″N 3°56′51″E
- Location: Mons
- Country: Belgium
- Denomination: Roman Catholic

History
- Status: Parish church

Architecture
- Functional status: Active
- Architectural type: Church
- Style: Gothic; Brabantine Gothic

Saint Waltrude Collegiate Church (French: Collégiale Sainte-Waudru) is a Roman Catholic parish church in Mons, Belgium, named in honour of Saint Waltrude. The church is a notable example of Gothic architecture, and is protected by the heritage register of Wallonia.

== History ==
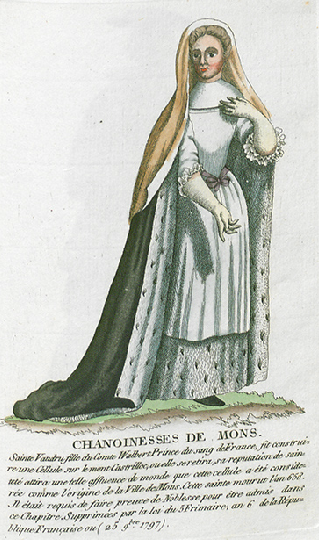
Philippe Joseph Maillart and Jeanne Catherine Maillart, Noble canoness of Mons

A community of canonesses dedicated to Waltrude first appear in the historical record in 1123. In 1214, Count Ferdinand and Countess Joan decreed that the community be limited to 30 women and that they all be the legitimate daughters of men of at least knightly rank. They took no vow of poverty or chastity. The history of the existing church building dates back to 1450, when construction of the east end began. It was a collegiate church for the canonesses.

The order of canonesses became famous in the 15th and 16th century for its religious dramas. It remained in existence until the French Revolution in the 1790s.

The canonesses were typically members of aristocratic houses. Originally it was possible to admit the daughters of knights. The statutes, as approved by Empress Maria Theresa, were made stricter in the 18th century as regards the requirement for the canonesses to prove their noble status.

Afterwards the building became a parish church.

=== Notable canonesses ===
- Isabel, sister of Katherine Swynford
- Eléonore-Jeanne de Mérode
- Maria and Anna van Egmont, daughters of Lamoral, Count of Egmont
- Marie-Magdelaine de Gavre
- Anne de Noyelles
- Anne Charlotte de Lorraine, Secular Abbess of the chapter in 1754 by imperial request of Empress Maria Theresa
- Princess Louise of Stolberg-Gedern, later wife of Prince Charles Edward Stuart (the Jacobite titular King of England, Scotland and Ireland)

== Architecture ==
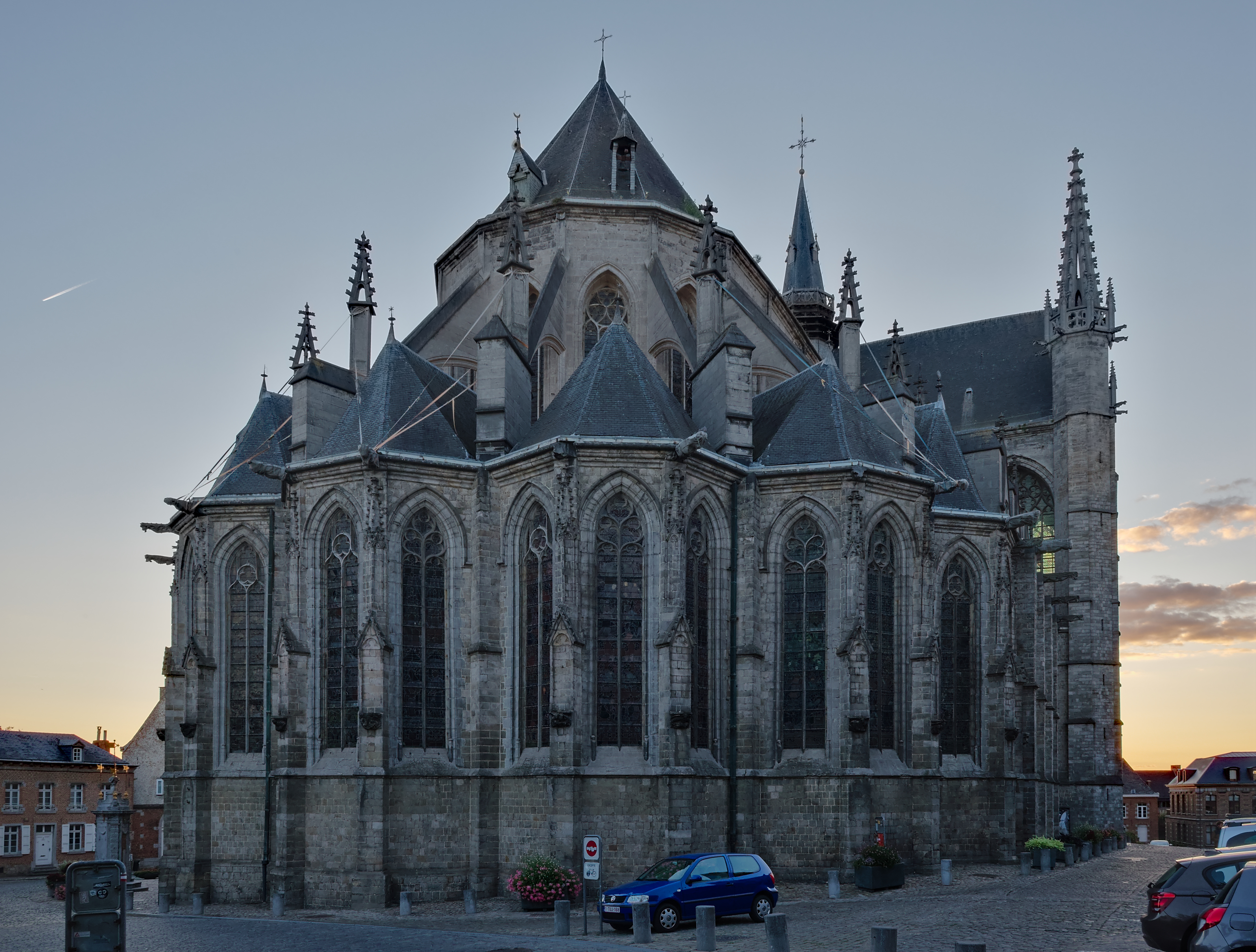
East side

=== Exterior ===
The exterior of the church is a fine example of Brabantine Gothic architecture, parts are built by Matheus de Layens. However, in the 17th century the works stopped and the building was never completely finished.

=== Interior ===
The interior contains important artworks, including sculptures by Jacques Du Brœucq and paintings by Peter Paul Rubens, Floris de Vriendt, Theodoor van Thulden, Otto Venius and Michiel Coxie.

Inside the church important graves can be found, amongst them Antoine de Carondelet and Alice of Namur.

=== Organ ===
The church's original instrument was lost and at the beginning of the 19th century the present one was acquired. It originally belonged to an abbey and dates from the late 17th century. Both the old and the current organs were associated with the Fetis family. Antoine-Joseph Fetis was titular organist in the 18th century. He taught his eldest son François-Joseph Fétis, a famous Belgian musician, who showed talent as an organist from a young age.

A large instrument, capable of a wide range of repertoire, the St Waltrude organ was the subject of a major restoration at the beginning of the 21st century involving Klais Orgelbau.

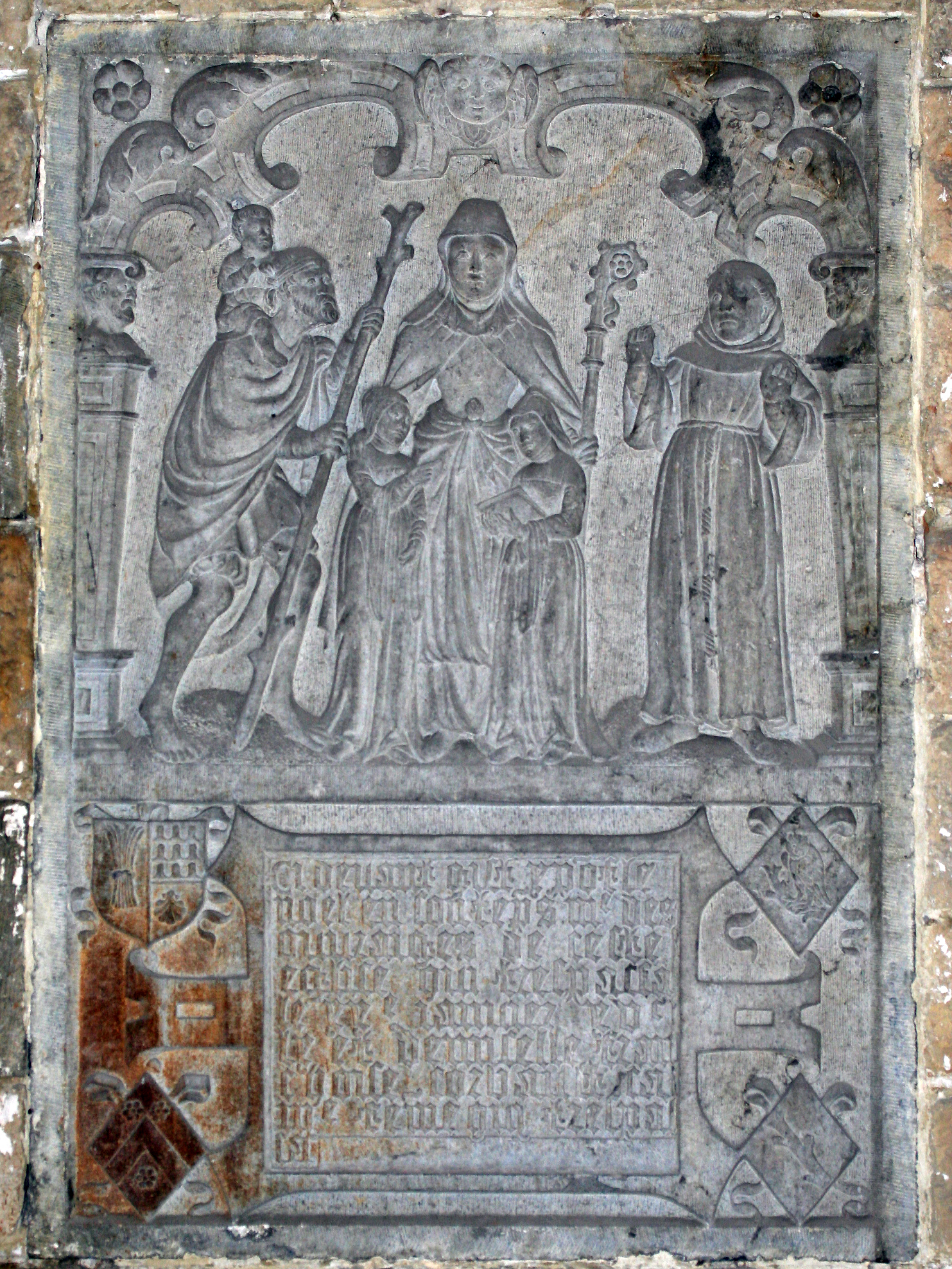
Bas-relief on the western wall in the collegiate church

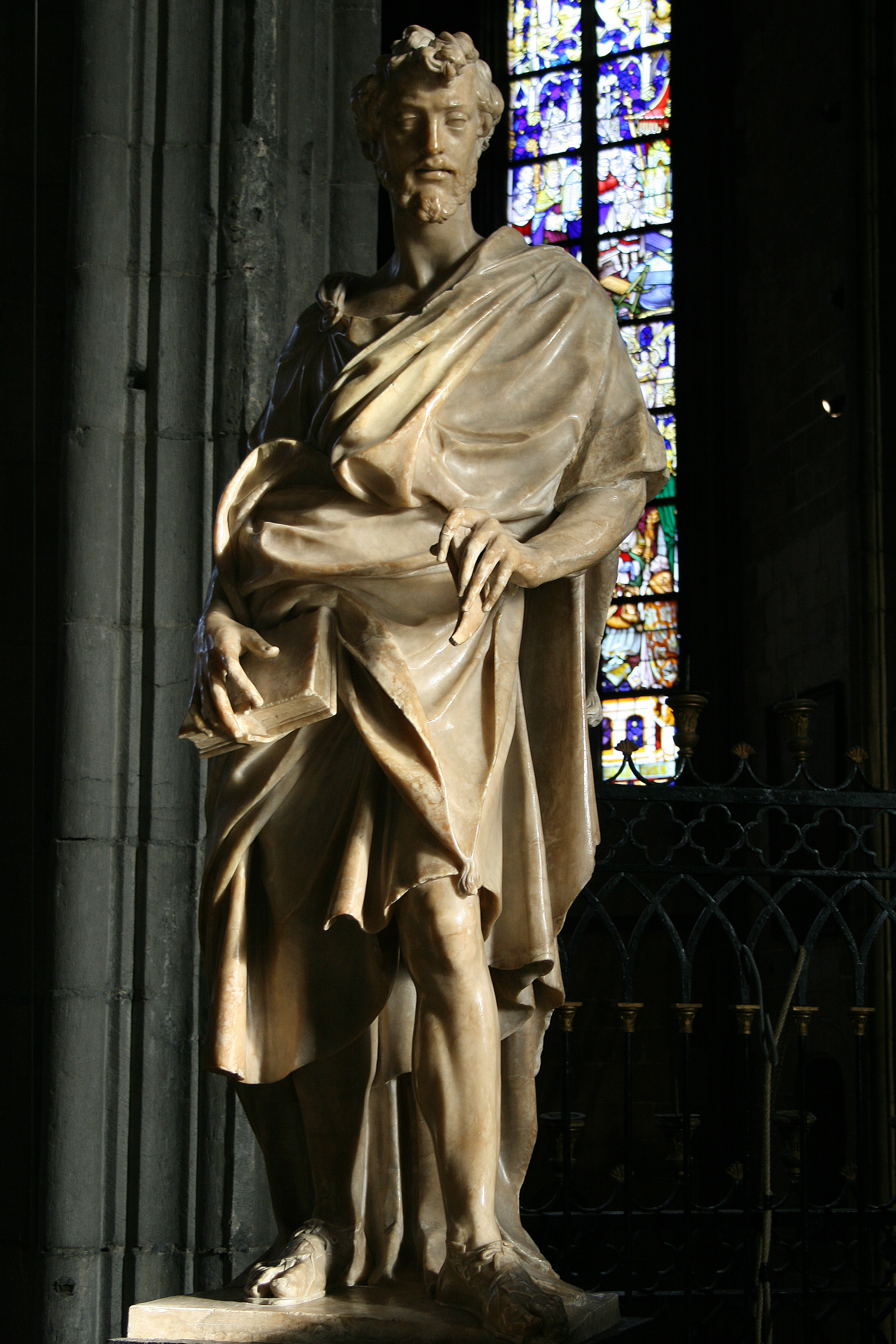
Statue of St. Bartholomew by Jacques Du Brœucq in the choir of the collegiate church

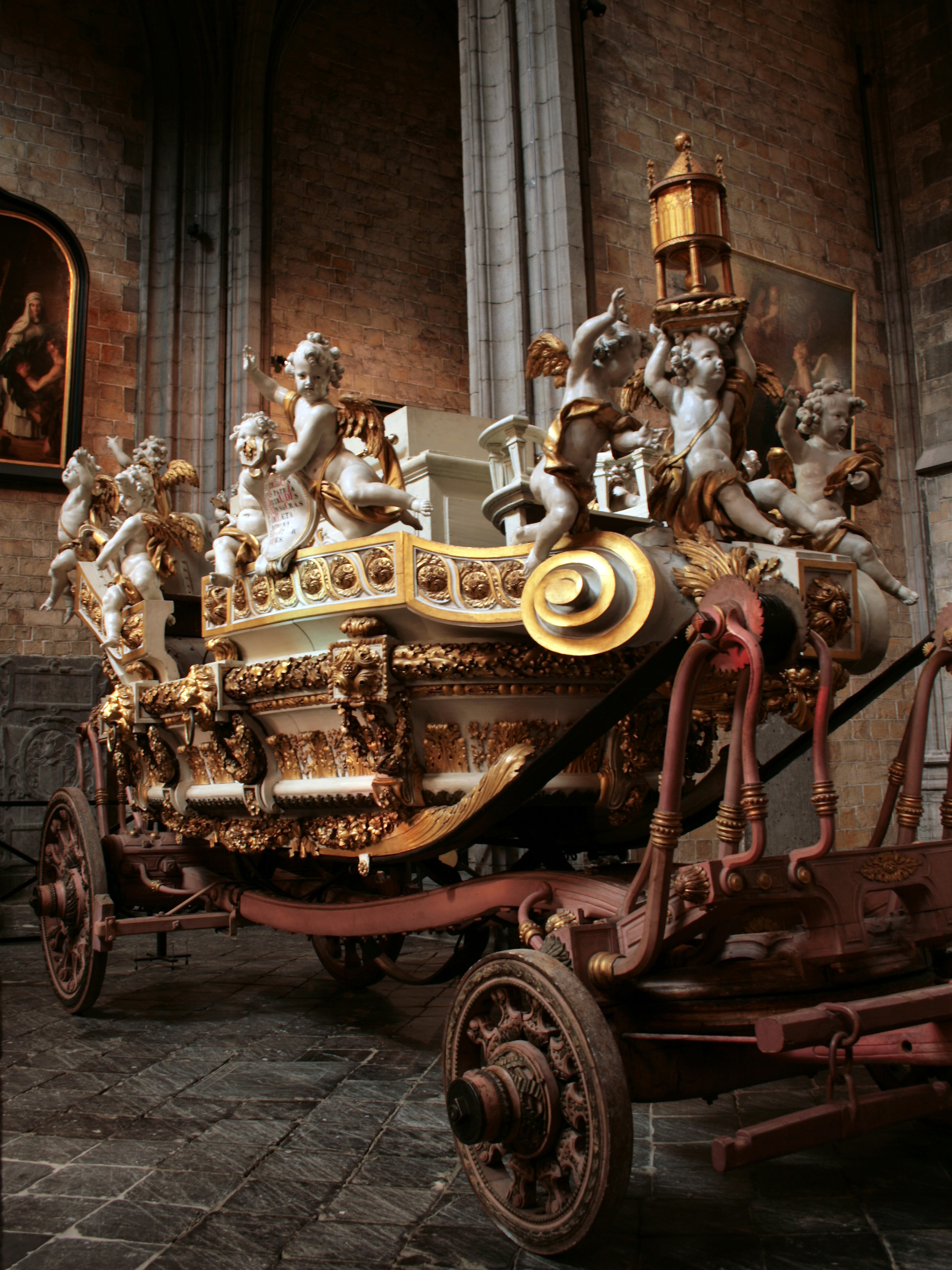
The Car d'Or (Golden Carriage) shown in the collegiate church
