= Head of Christ from the Crooked or Brown Cross =

Sculpted head of Christ in Leuven, Belgium

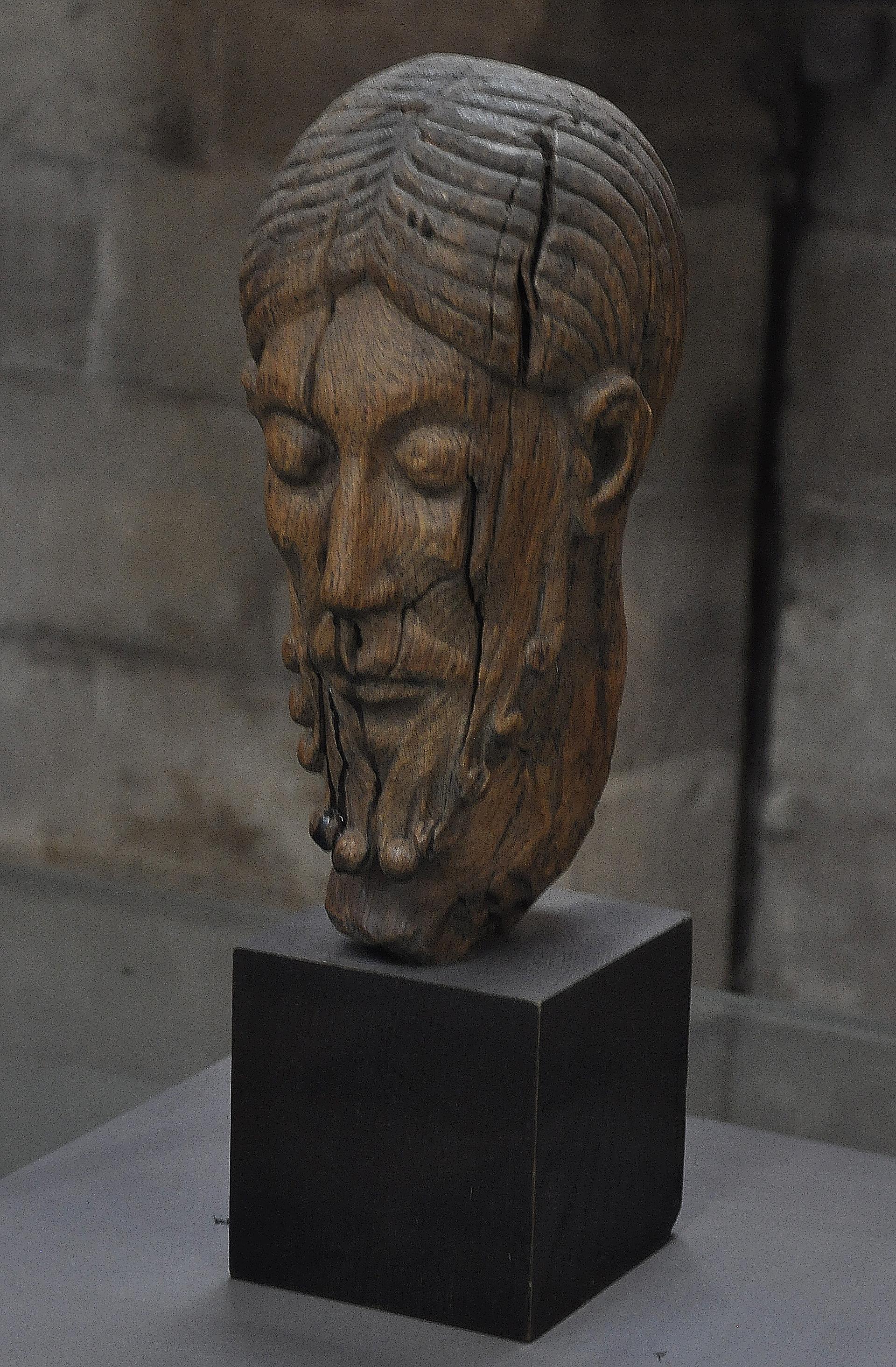
- Year: 12th to 13th century
- Location: Leuven, Belgium
- 50°52′46″N 4°42′04″E

The Head of Christ from the Crooked or Brown Cross is a sculpted head of Christ, the only remaining part of one of the most worshipped crucifixes in Leuven, Belgium. It played an important role in the city's history. The head is found in St. Peter's Church in Leuven.

== The crooked or brown cross ==
The statue, which was made around 1200, was originally featured in the Kolvenierskapel in St. Peter's Church. Crooked Christ was the miracle statue of Leuven, which means that it was an image with a special devotion connected to it. Every time a disaster threatened the city, the crucifix was carried around in a procession. This ritual was practiced from the fourteenth century to the eighteenth century.

The posture of the statue was striking: it represented a crucified Christ, but unlike more common representations, his right arm hung loose and his entire body was bent forward. Folktales attributed this exceptional attitude to (mythical) achievements. One tale is about how the statue grasped a thief who wanted to steal a golden crown. Historians suspect that the statue originally was part of a group of statues that represented the descent from the cross. Such image groups were common in the 12th and 13th century, especially in Southern Europe.

== Church fire ==
During the First World War in 1914, a fire burned in the church. Multiple pieces were lost in flames, including the Crooked Cross. However, at the time of the fire Christ's head was in the workshop of sculptor Egide Goyes, who was restoring it between 1843 and 1845. Goyes had replaced the original head with a cast. In 1928 the work appeared in an art dealership in Saint-Germain-en-Laye, where it was bought five years later by Abbé H., a Parisian prehistorian. In 1955 it returned to the St. Peter's Church in Leuven.
