= Matheus de Layens =

Flemish architect of the 15th century

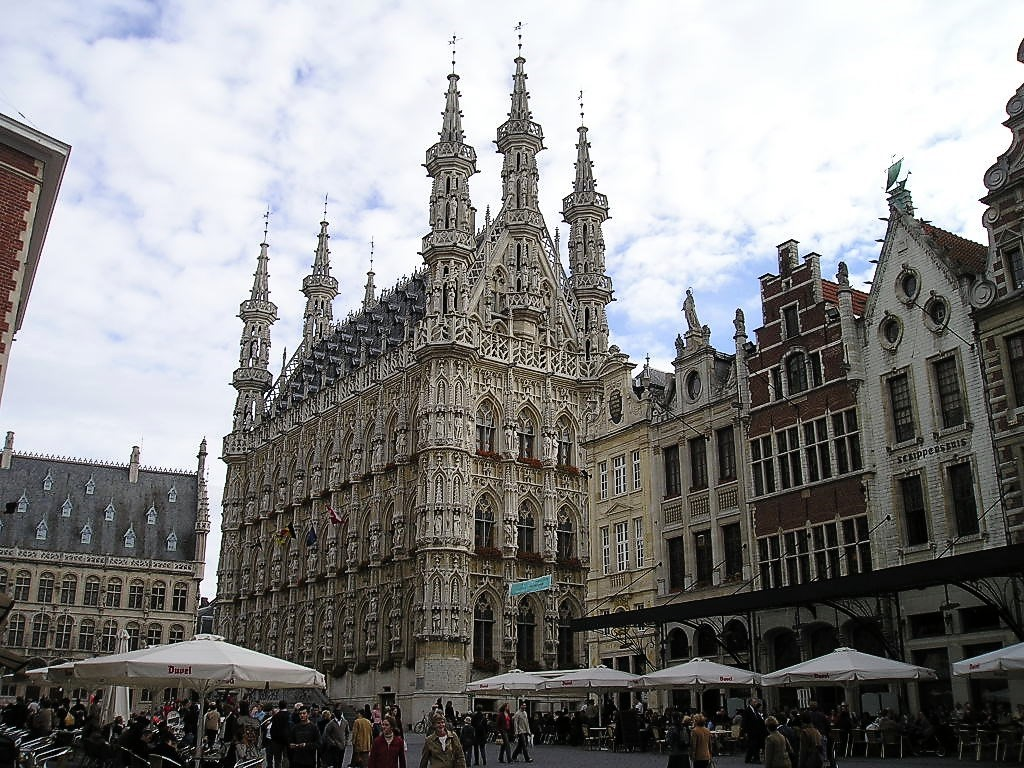
Leuven Town Hall (center) and the Tafelrond (background, left)

Matheus de Layens (d. Leuven, 3 December 1483) was a Brabantine architect from the 15th century.

He was employed in Leuven from 1433, first under the architect Sulpitius van Vorst (d. 1439), and afterwards under Jan Keldermans II, whom he succeeded in 1445 as master mason. In that capacity he developed the town fortifications and led the construction of Leuven Town Hall (1448–1469), as well as the transept of Saint Peter's Church. The sacrament tower of Saint Peter's church, built in 1451, is also attributed to him.

Around 1450, de Layens worked on St. Leonard's Church in Zoutleeuw, "Our Lady of the Pool" (Onze-Lieve-Vrouw-ten-Poel) church at Tienen, and the St. Sulpitius Church at Diest. From 1457 he took over, from architect Jan Spijkens, the construction of Saint Waltrude Collegiate Church at Mons, and restored the town hall there in 1479.

His last work (1480–1487) was the monumental Round Table building (het Tafelrond) on the east side of Leuven's Grote Markt square. The building was torn down and replaced in about 1818, but was reconstructed in its original style and location in 1921.
