= Saint Peter's Church, Leuven =

Church in Leuven, Belgium

UNESCO World Heritage Site
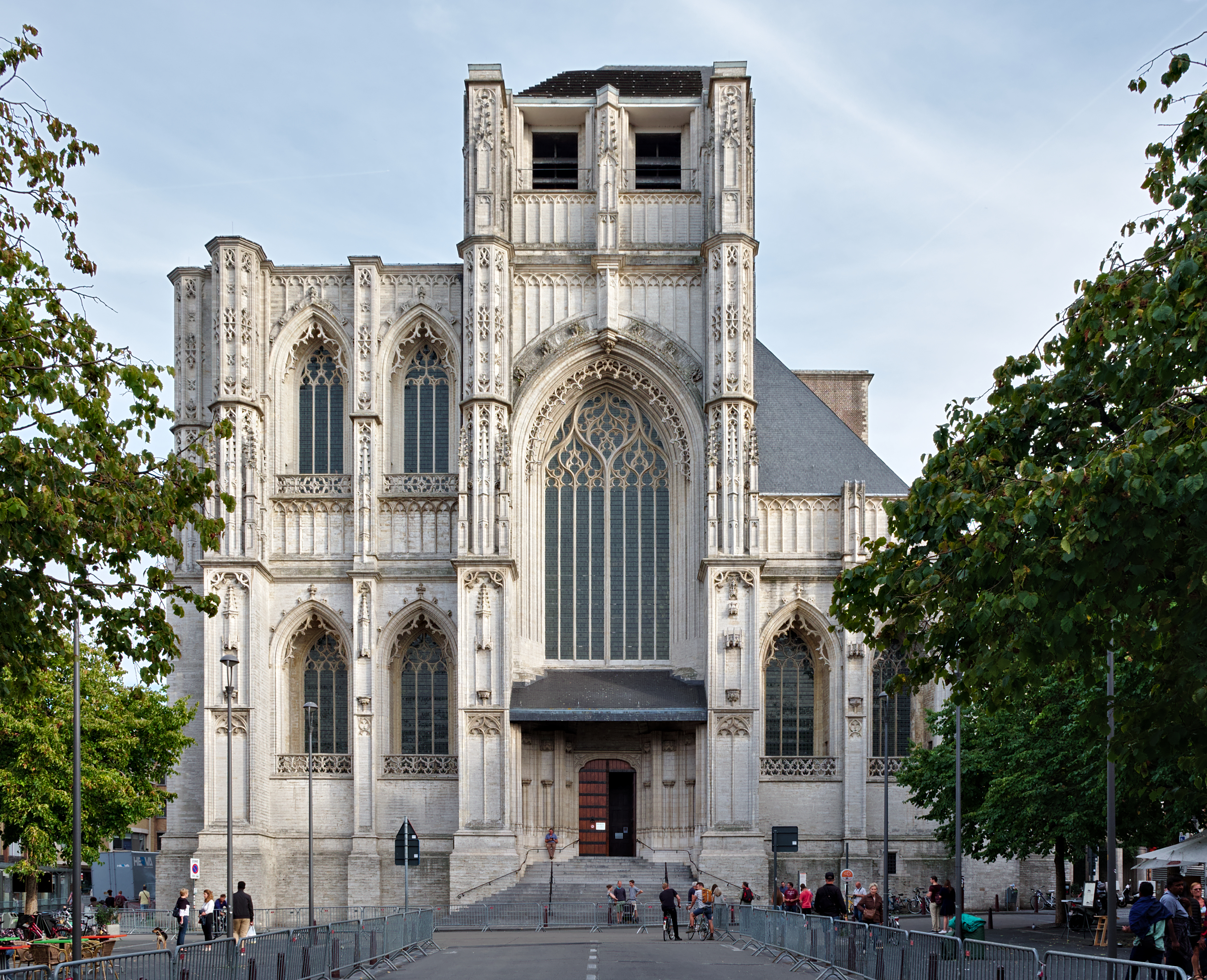
- West façade (Note: Unfinished three towers, roofline of church visible behind shortest (right) tower; construction had progressed higher before portions collapsed.)
- Interactive map of Saint Peter's Church, Leuven
- Official name: Sint-Pieterskerk / Belfort
- Location: Leuven, Belgium
- Part of: Belfries of Belgium and France
- Reference: 943bis-012
- Inscription: 1999 (23rd Session)
- Extensions: 2005
- Coordinates: 50°52′46″N 4°42′05″E

Saint Peter's Church (Dutch: Sint-Pieterskerk) is a Roman Catholic church in Leuven, Belgium, built in the 15th century in the Brabantine Gothic style. The church has a cruciform floor plan and a low bell tower that has never been completed. It is 93 metres (305 ft) long. It is located on the city's Grote Markt (main square), opposite the Town Hall. In 1999, the belfry and bell tower of the church was inscribed on the UNESCO World Heritage List as part of the Belfries of Belgium and France site, in recognition of the civil importance and architecture of the belfries in the region.

== History ==
=== Early history ===
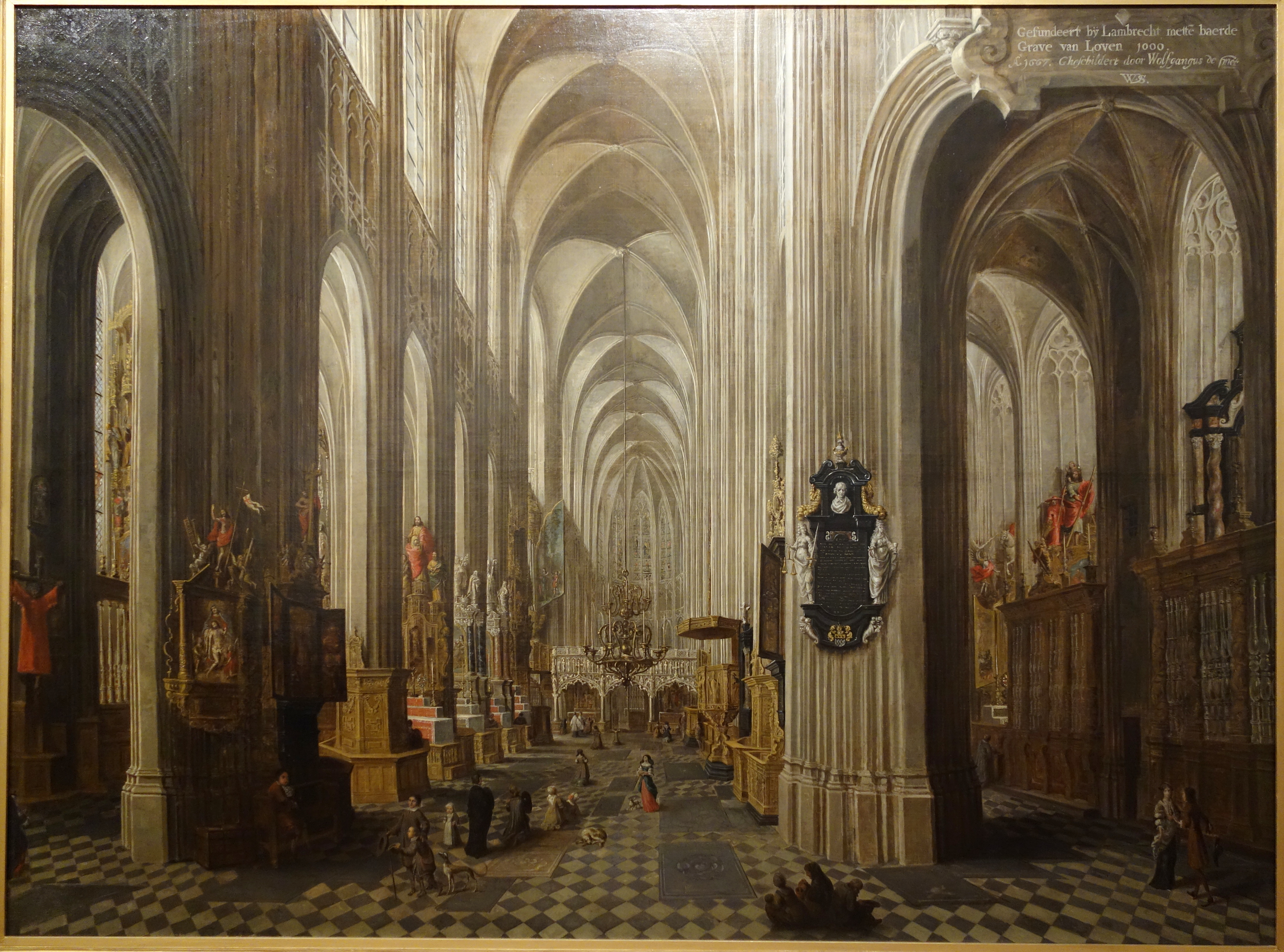
Interior of the St. Peter's Church, Leuven by Wolfgang de Smet, 1667

The first church on the site, made of wood and presumably founded in 986, burned down in 1176. It was replaced by a Romanesque church, made of stone, featuring a West End flanked by two round towers like at Our Lady's Basilica in Maastricht. Of the Romanesque building only part of the crypt remains, underneath the chancel of the actual church.

Construction of the present Gothic edifice, significantly larger than its predecessor, was begun approximately in 1425, and was continued for more than half a century in a remarkably uniform style, replacing the older church progressively from east (chancel) to west. Its construction period overlapped with that of the Town Hall across the Markt, and in the earlier decades of construction shared the same succession of architects as its civic neighbor: Sulpitius van Vorst to start with, followed by Jan II Keldermans and later on Matheus de Layens. In 1497 the building was practically complete, although modifications, especially at the West End, continued.

=== Towers ===
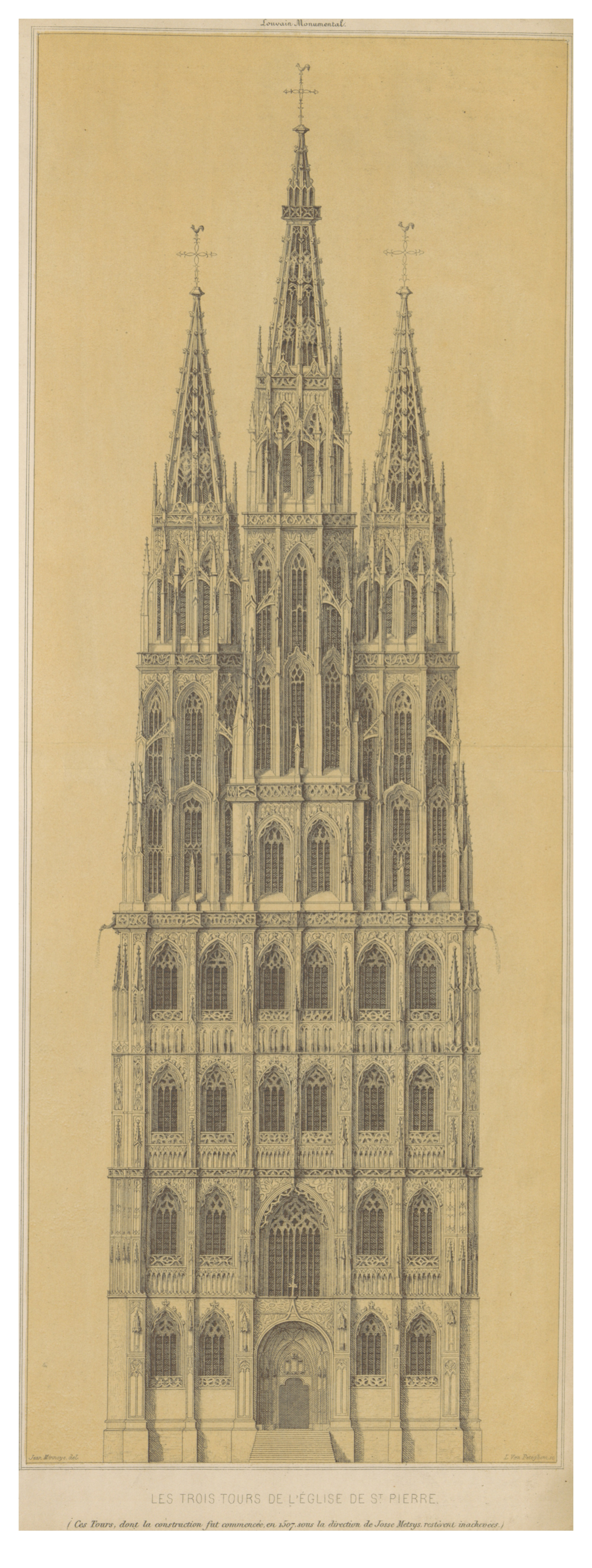
1505 plan for three towers

In 1458, a fire struck the old Romanesque towers that still flanked the West End of the uncompleted building. The first arrangements for a new tower complex followed quickly, but were never realized. Then, in 1505, Joost Matsys (brother of painter Quentin Matsys) forged an ambitious plan to erect three colossal towers of freestone surmounted by openwork spires, which would have had a grand effect, as the central spire would rise up to about 170 m, making it the world's tallest structure at the time. Insufficient ground stability and funds proved this plan impracticable, as the central tower reached less than a third of its intended height before the project was abandoned in 1541. After the height was further reduced by partial collapses from 1570 to 1604, the main tower now rises barely above the church roof; at its sides are mere stubs. The architect had, however, made a maquette of the original design, which is preserved in the southern transept.

Despite their incomplete status, the towers are listed in the UNESCO World Heritage Site Belfries of Belgium and France.

=== Wars and aftermath ===
The church suffered severe damage in both World Wars. In 1914 a fire caused the collapse of the roof and in 1944 a bomb destroyed part of the northern side. The reconstructed roof is surmounted at the crossing by a flèche, which, unlike the 18th-century cupola that preceded it, blends stylistically with the rest of the church.

A very late (1998) addition is the jacquemart, or golden automaton, which periodically rings a bell near the clock on the gable of the southern transept, above the main southern entrance door.

== Description ==
=== Exterior ===
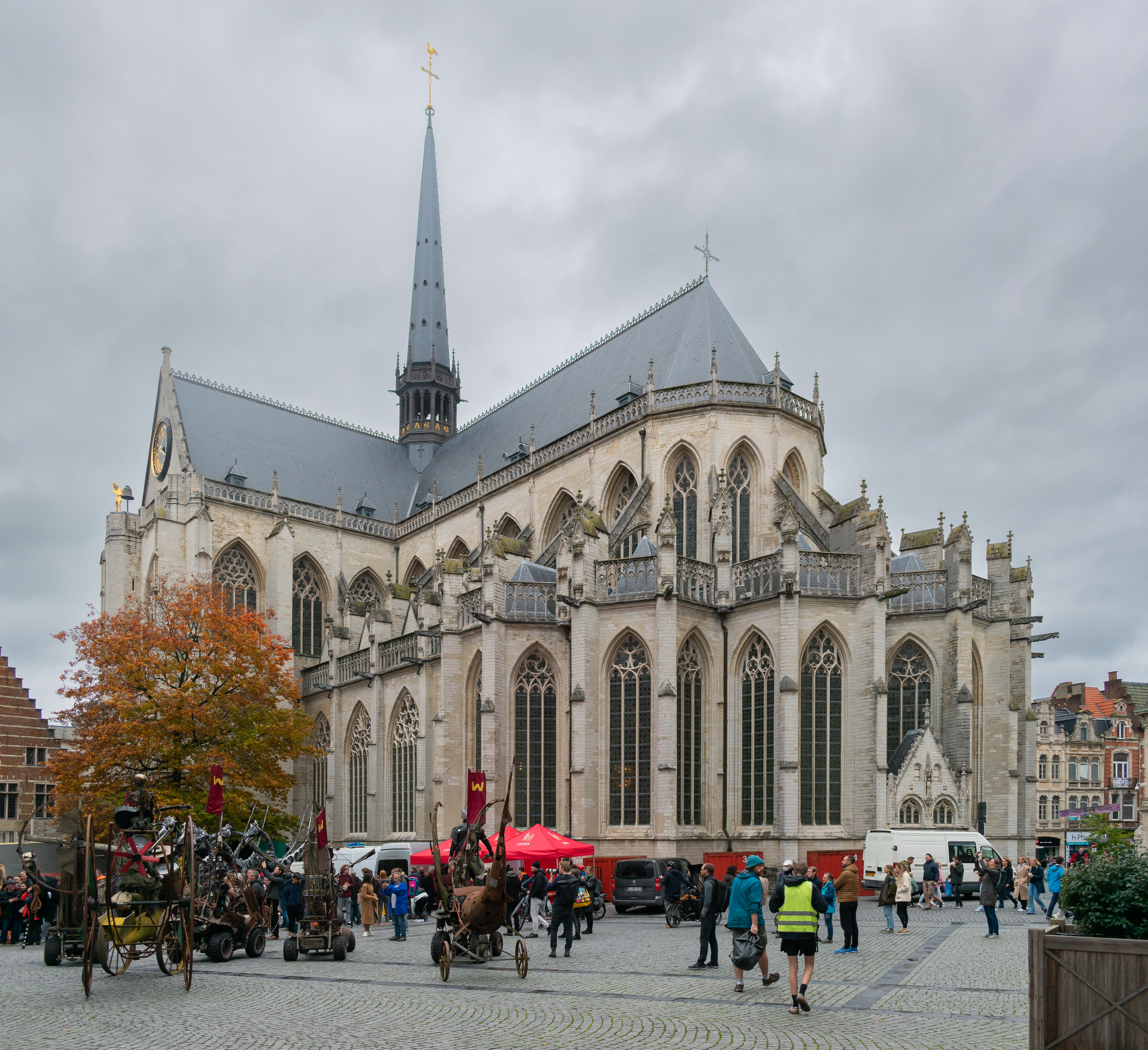
Choir and ridge

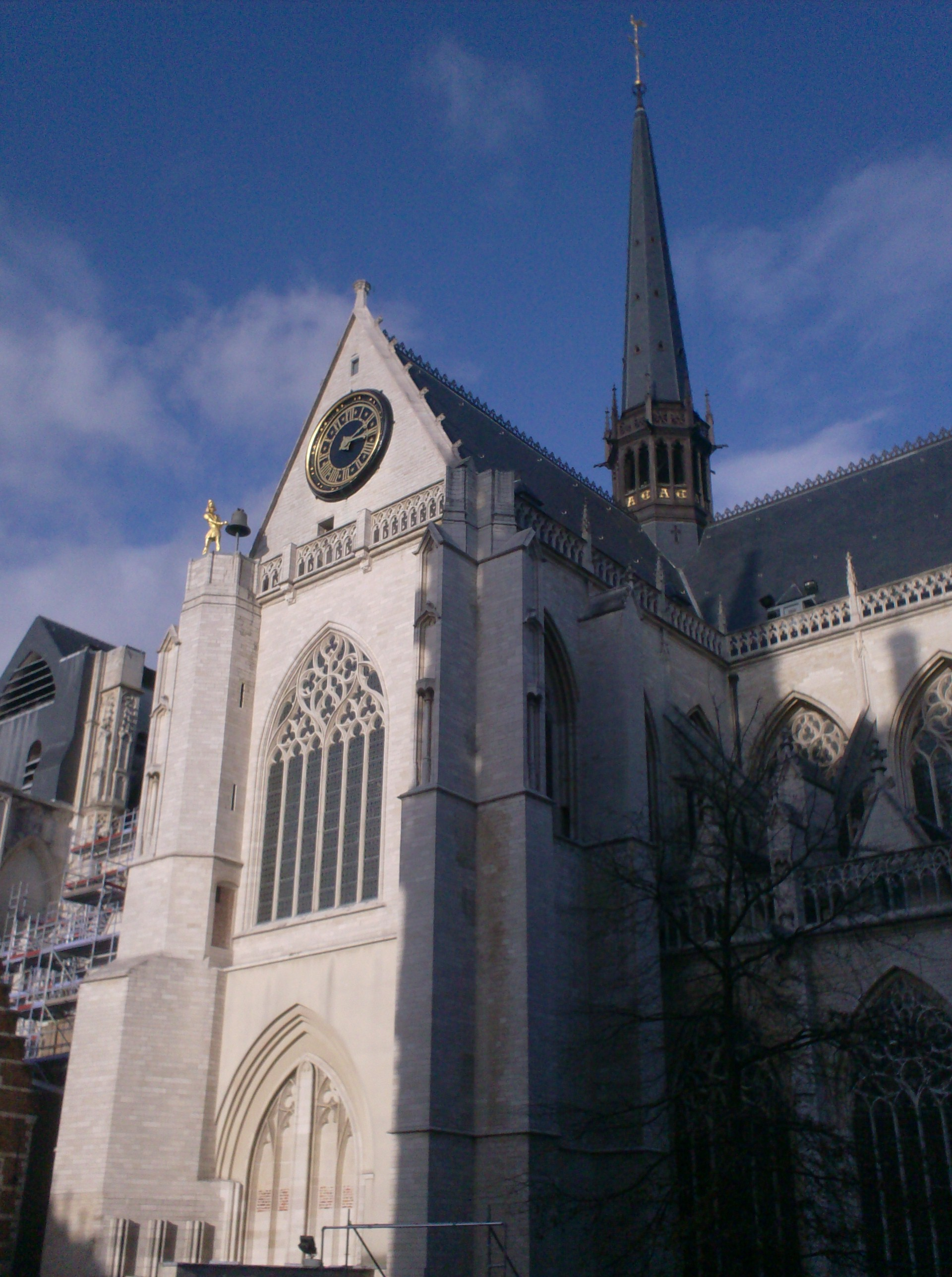
Transept

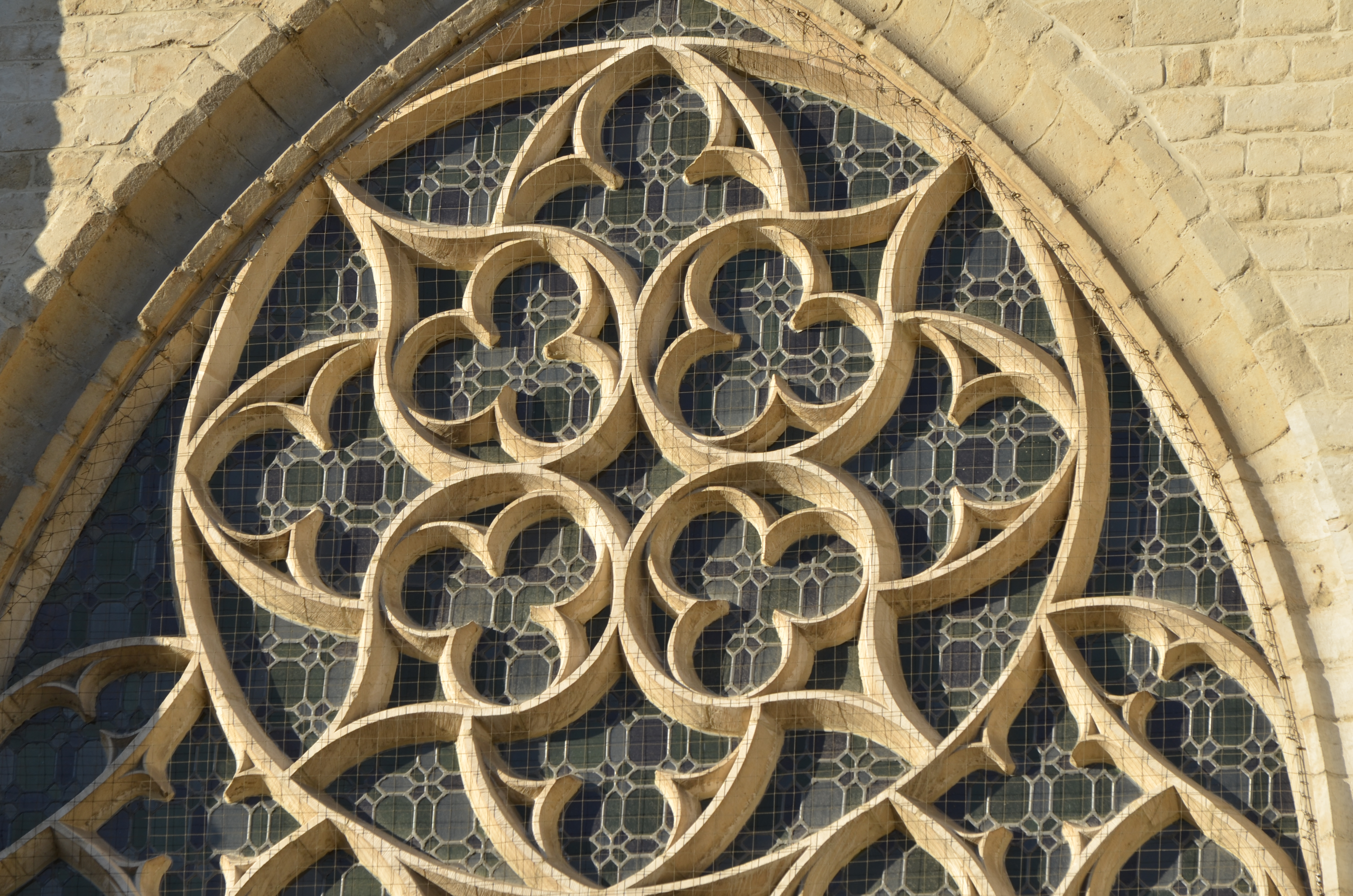
Gothic windows

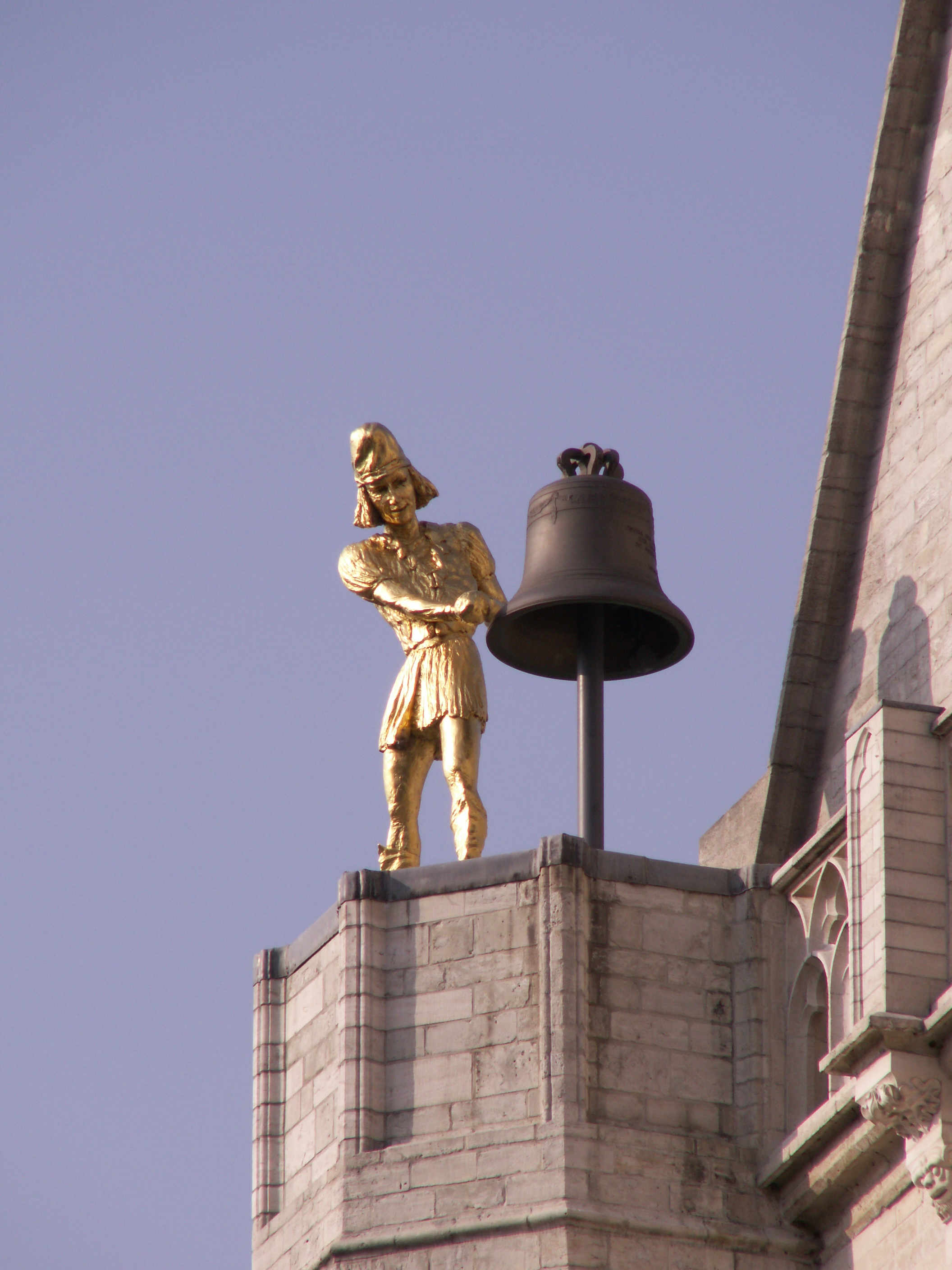
Jacquemart

=== Interior ===
In side chapels are the tombs of Duke Henry I of Brabant (d. 1235), his wife Matilda (d. 1211) and their daughter Marie (d. 1260). Godfrey II of Leuven is also buried in the church.

An elaborate stone tabernacle (1450), in the form of a hexagonal tower, soars amidst a bunch of crocketed pinnacles to a height of 12.5 metres (41 ft). A creation of the architect de Layens (1450), it is an example of what is called in Dutch a sacramentstoren, or in German a Sakramentshaus, on which artists lavished more pains than on almost any other artwork.

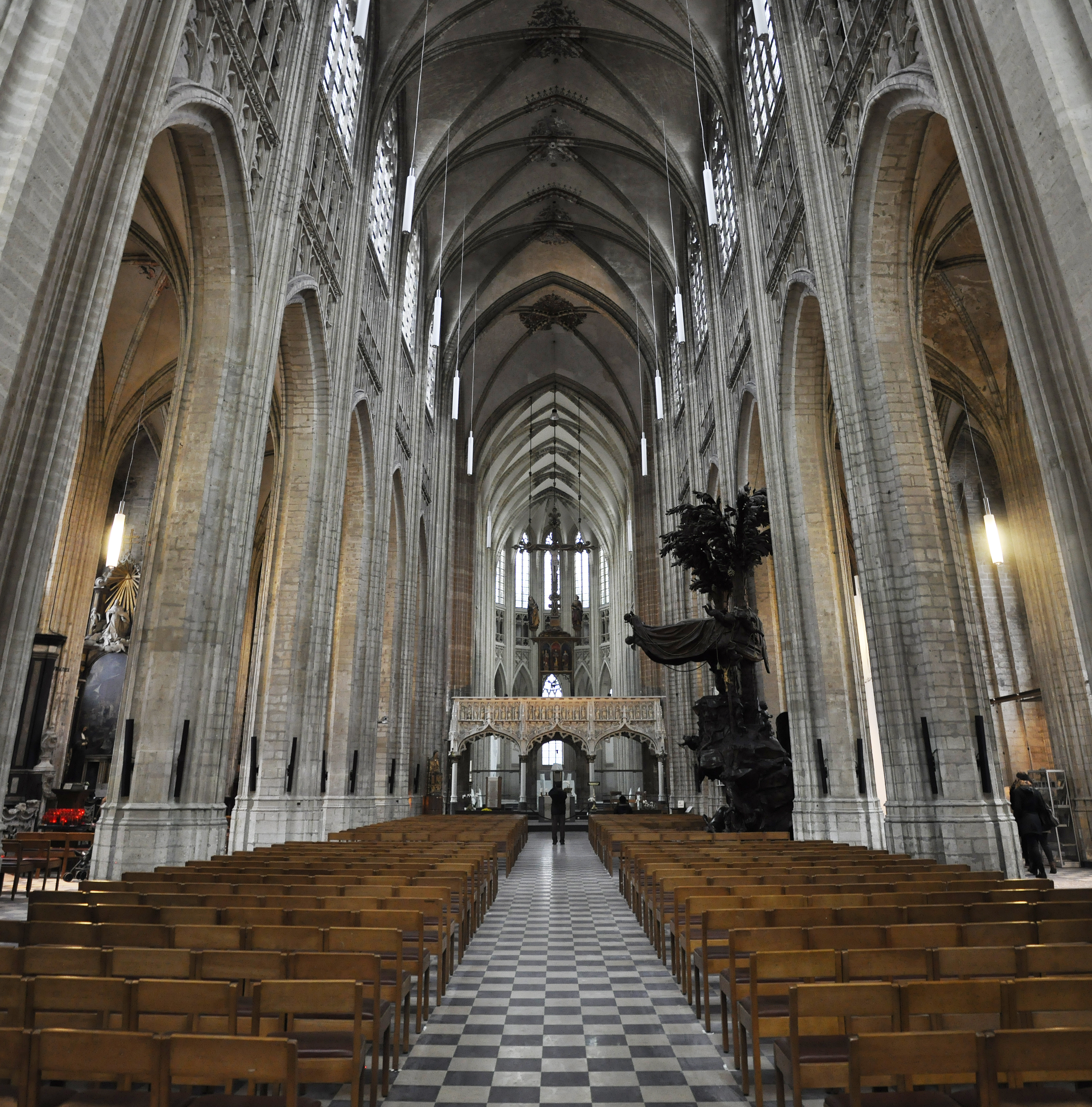
Nave

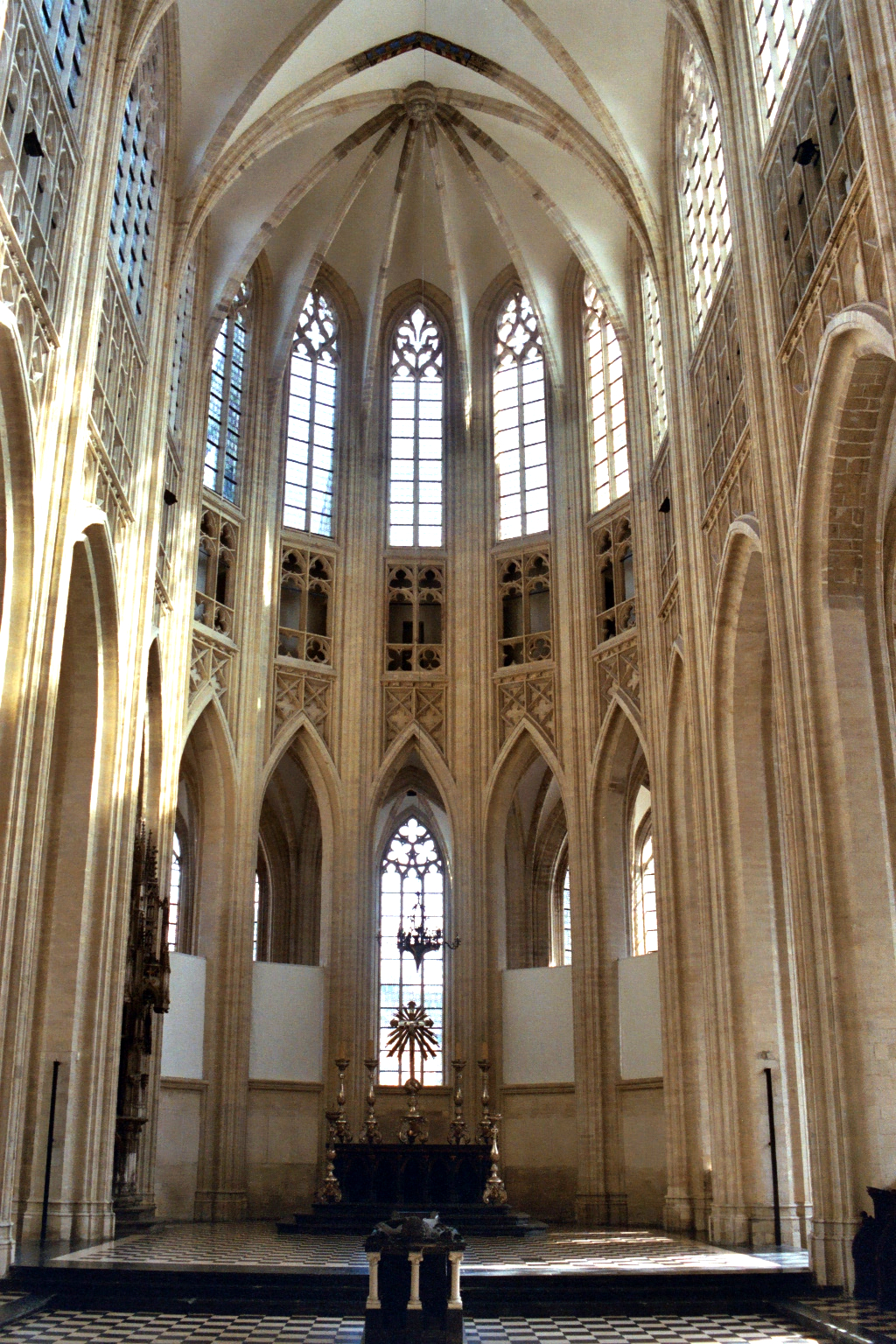
Priest choir

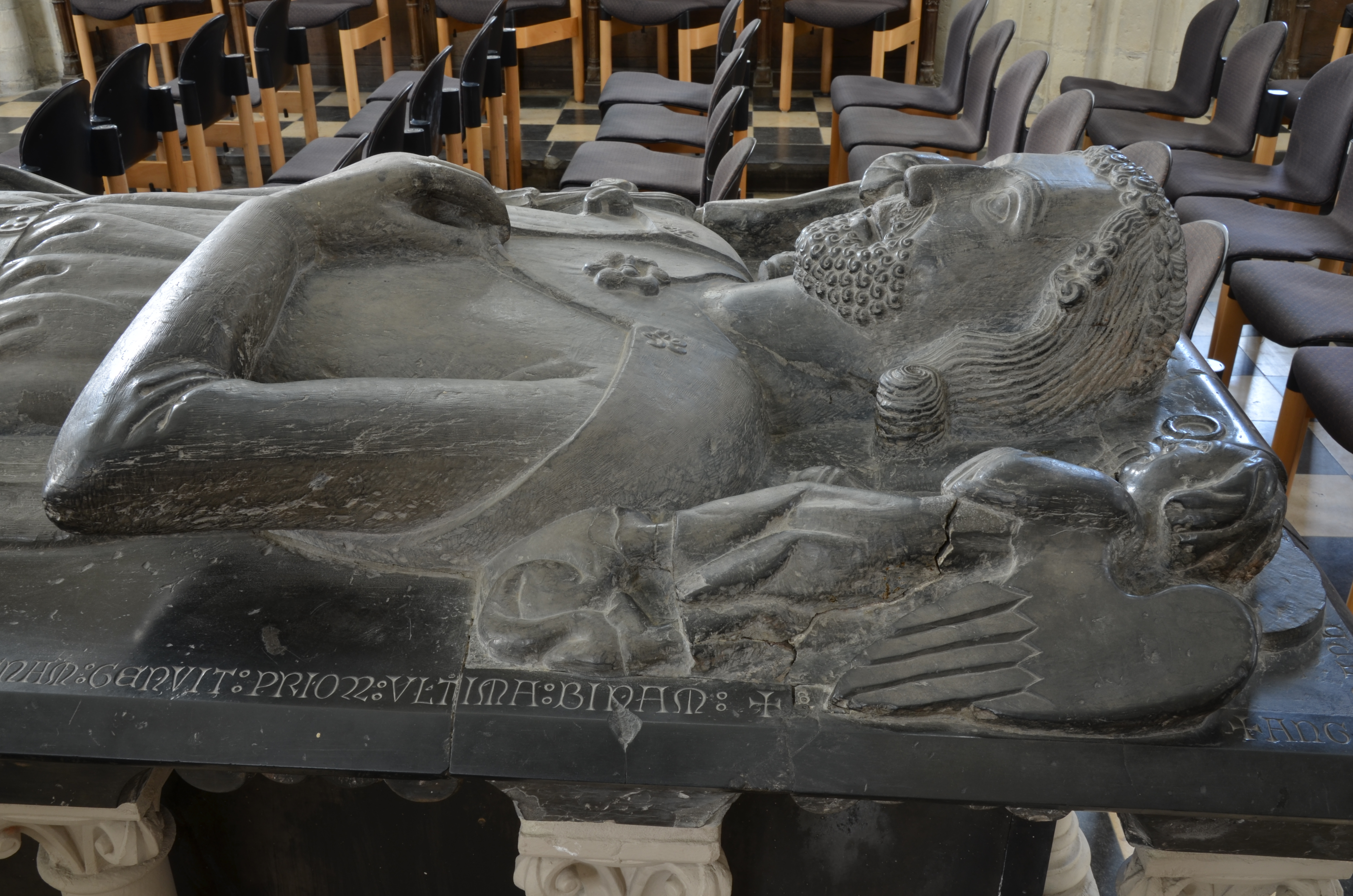
Tomb of Henry I

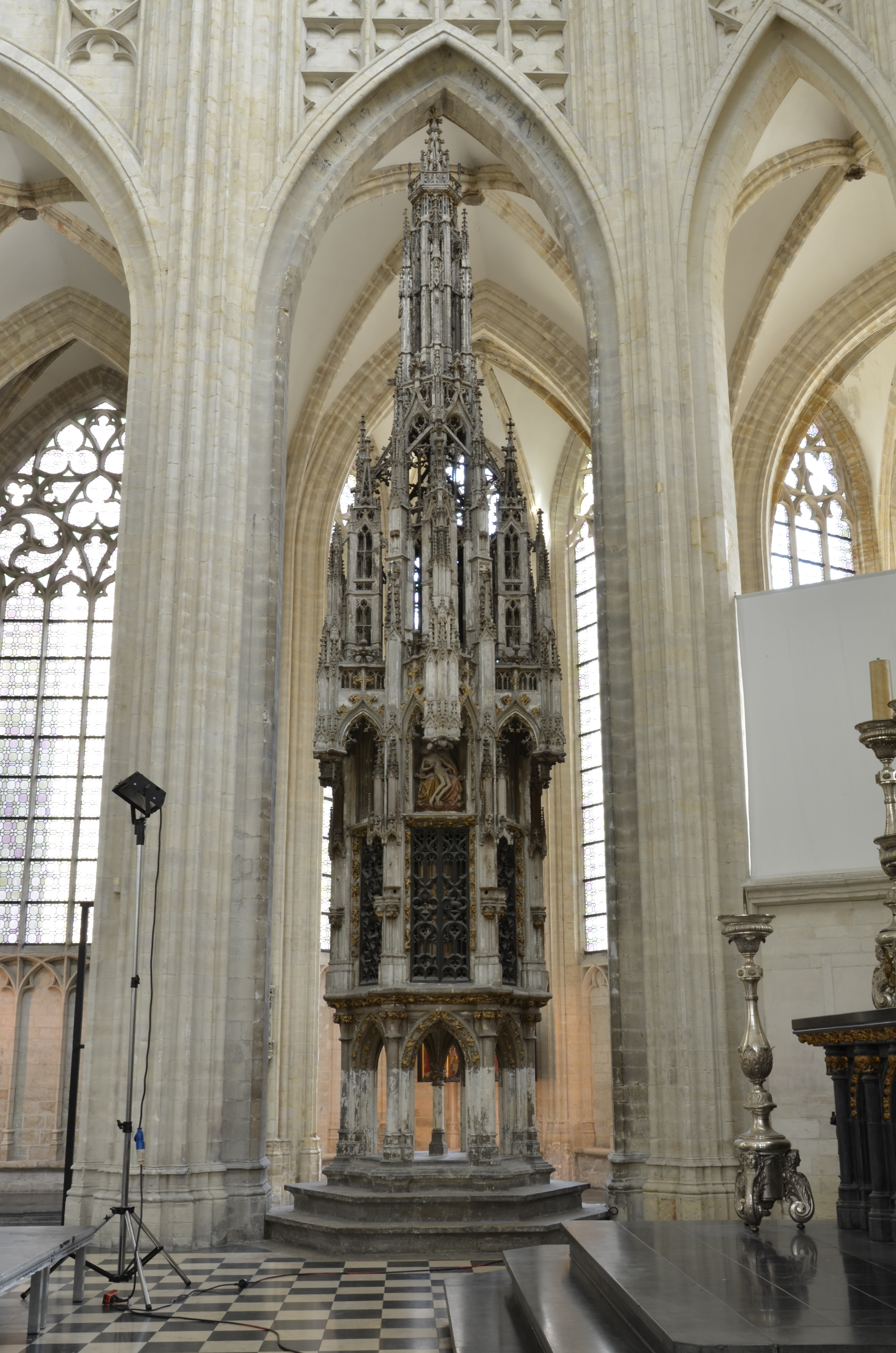
Sacrament Tower

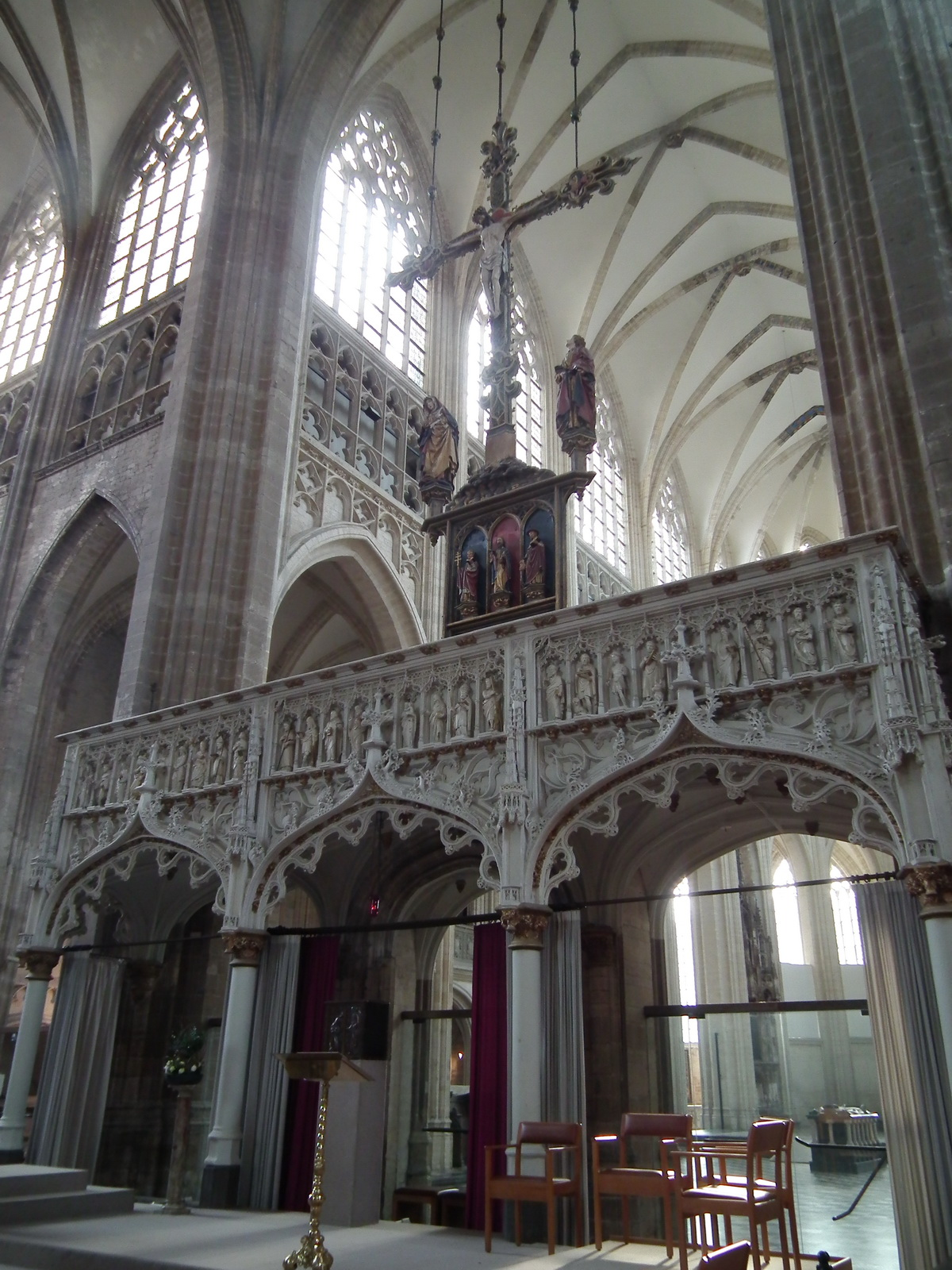
Rood screen

=== Furnishings ===
The large and elaborate oak pulpit was transferred from the abbey church of Ninove as the original pulpit was sold during the French occupation. It is a 17th-century work by the Flemish sculptor Jacques Bergé. It is an example of the naturalist pulpits produced in the Southern Netherlands (especially in the Duchy of Brabant and in Mechelen) from the 17th to the 19th century. This Baroque pulpit in oak is a total work of art of which the parts (support, bowl, staircase, soundboard) are forged into one sculptural whole. The support shows a life-size representation of Norbert of Xanten falling from a horse.

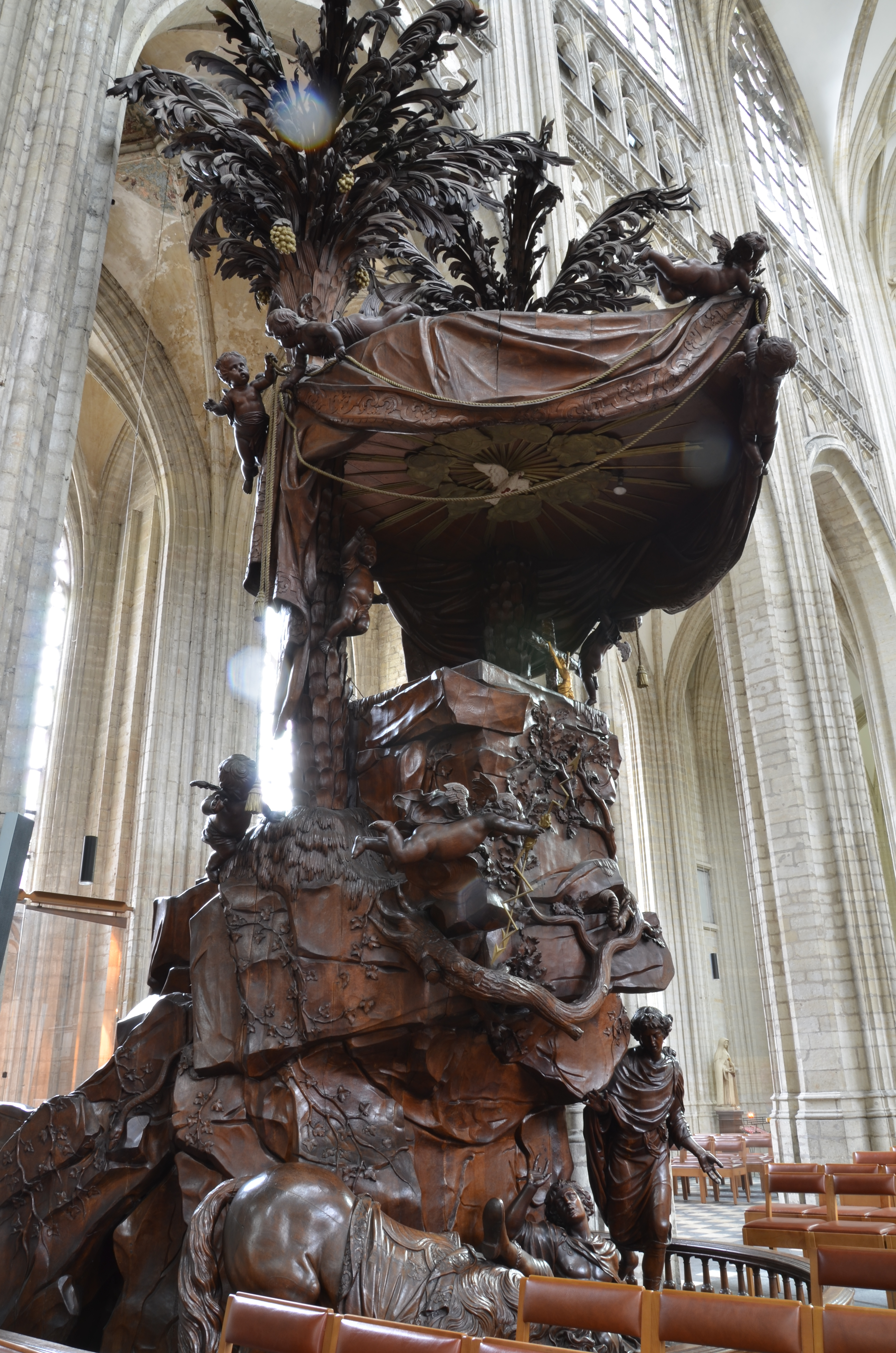
Baroque pulpit

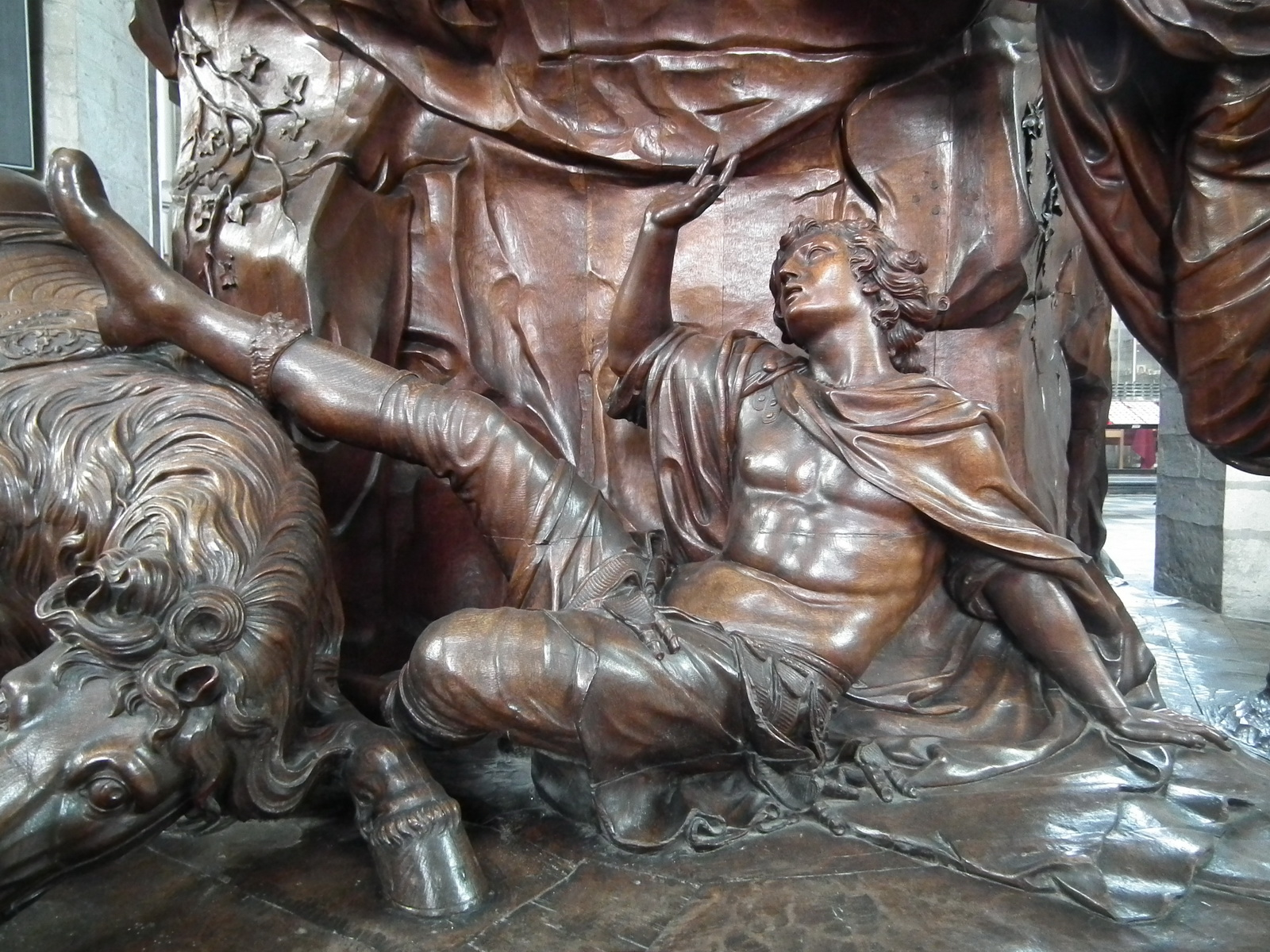
Pulpit detail

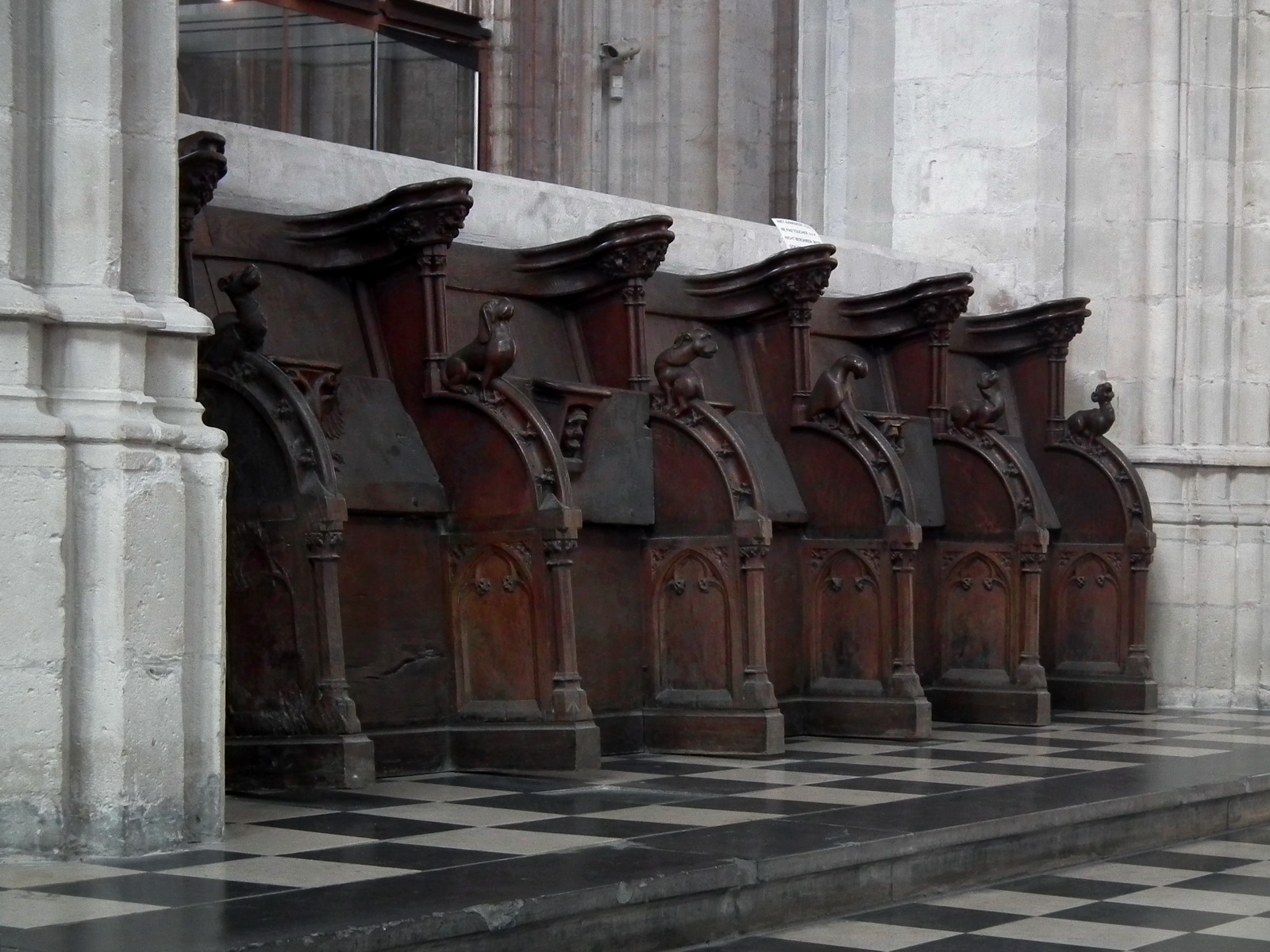
Choir stalls

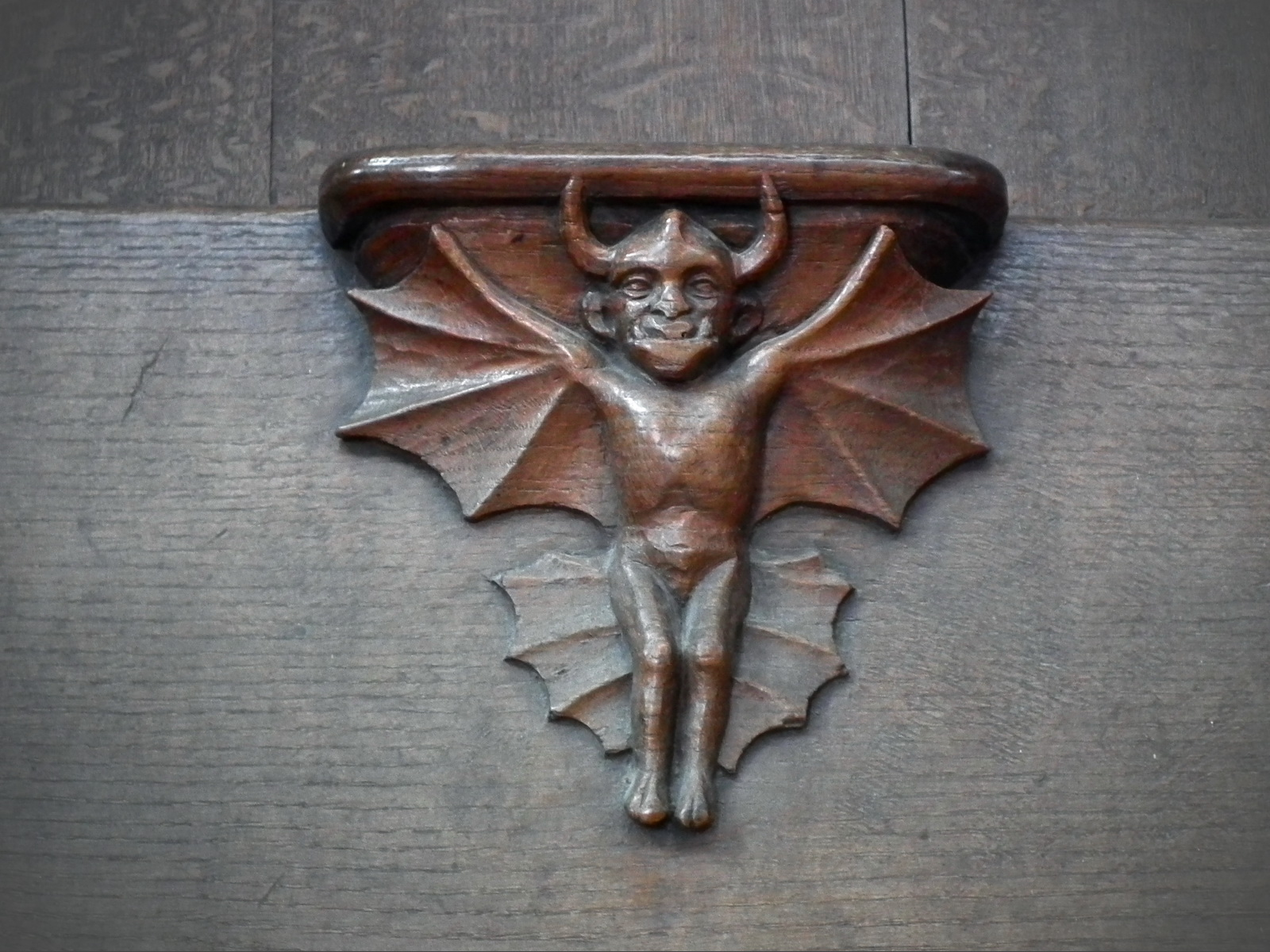
Detail 'misericorde'

== Artworks and relics ==
Despite the devastation during the World Wars, the church remains rich in works of art. The chancel and ambulatory were turned into a museum in 1998, where visitors can view a collection of sculptures, paintings and metalwork.

=== Statues ===
The church holds Nicolaas de Bruyne's 1442 sculpture of the Madonna and Child enthroned on the seat of wisdom (Sedes Sapientiae). The theme is still used today as the emblem of Katholieke Universiteit Leuven. One of the oldest objects in the art collection is a 12th-century wooden head, being the only remainder of a crucifix burnt in World War II.

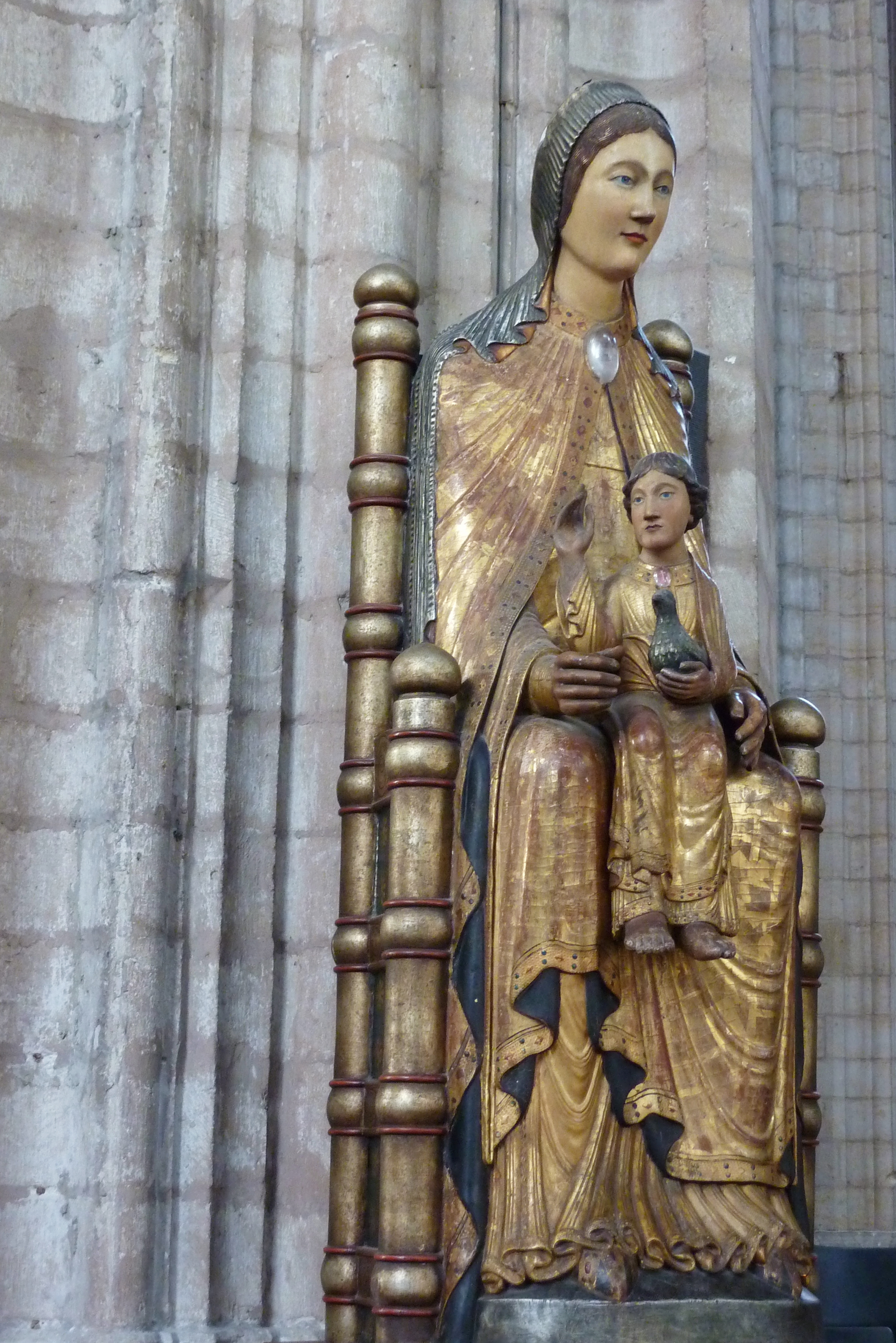
Sedes Sapientiae

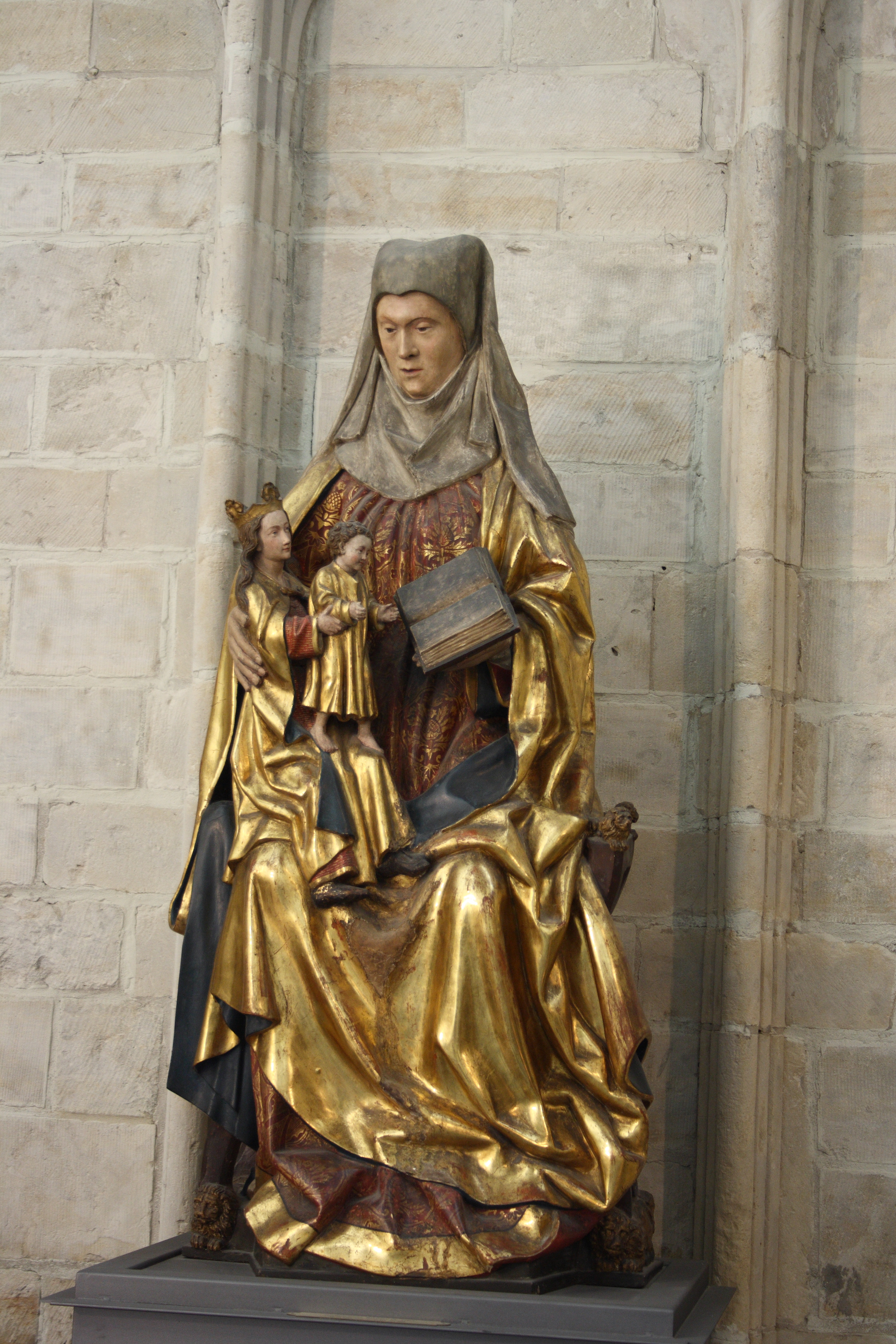
Anna te Drieën

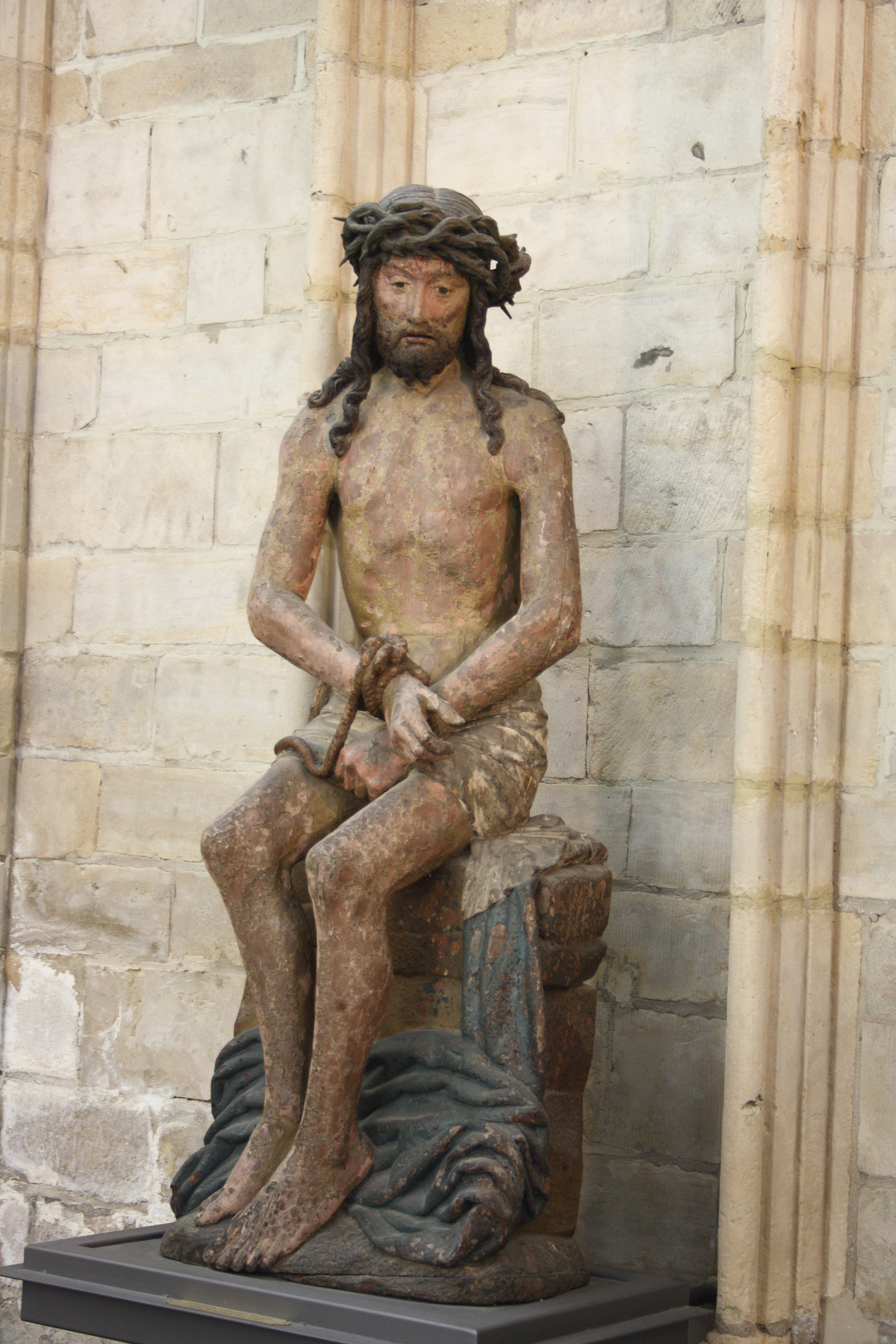
Christ

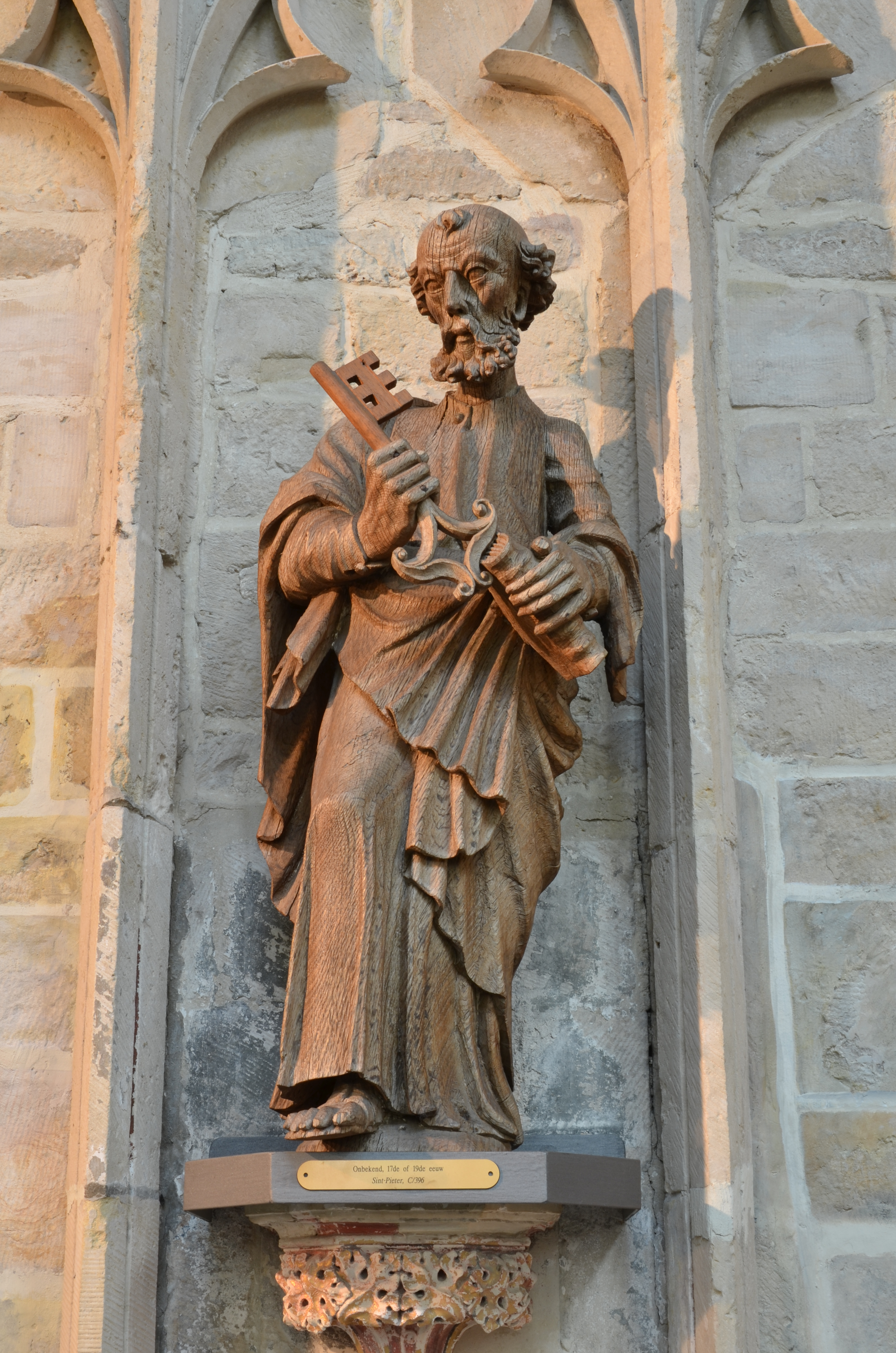
Saint Peter

=== Paintings ===
Altarpiece of the Holy Sacrament or Triptych of the Last Supper is one of the masterpieces in the church and was painted by Dirk Bouts between 1464 and 1468. Other masterpieces in the church are The Martyrdom of Saint Erasmus from the same painter and the Edelheere Altarpiece (Descent from the Cross), an early copy after a work by Rogier van der Weyden. The Scenes from the Life and Martyrdom of Saints Catherine and Clement were painted by the Leuven painter Jan Rombouts the Elder around 1530.

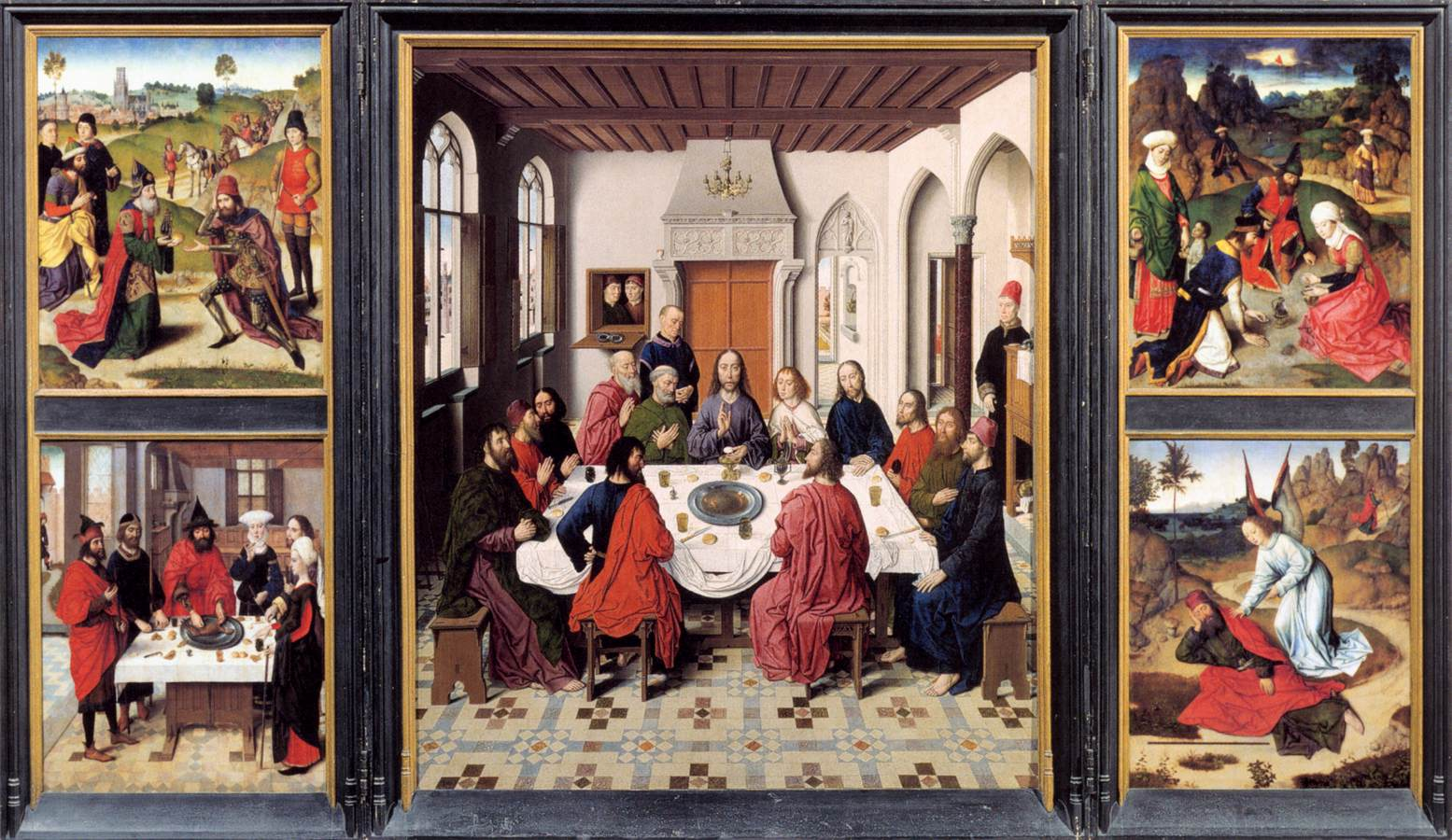
Altarpiece of the Holy Sacrament or Triptych of the Last Supper, Dirk Bouts

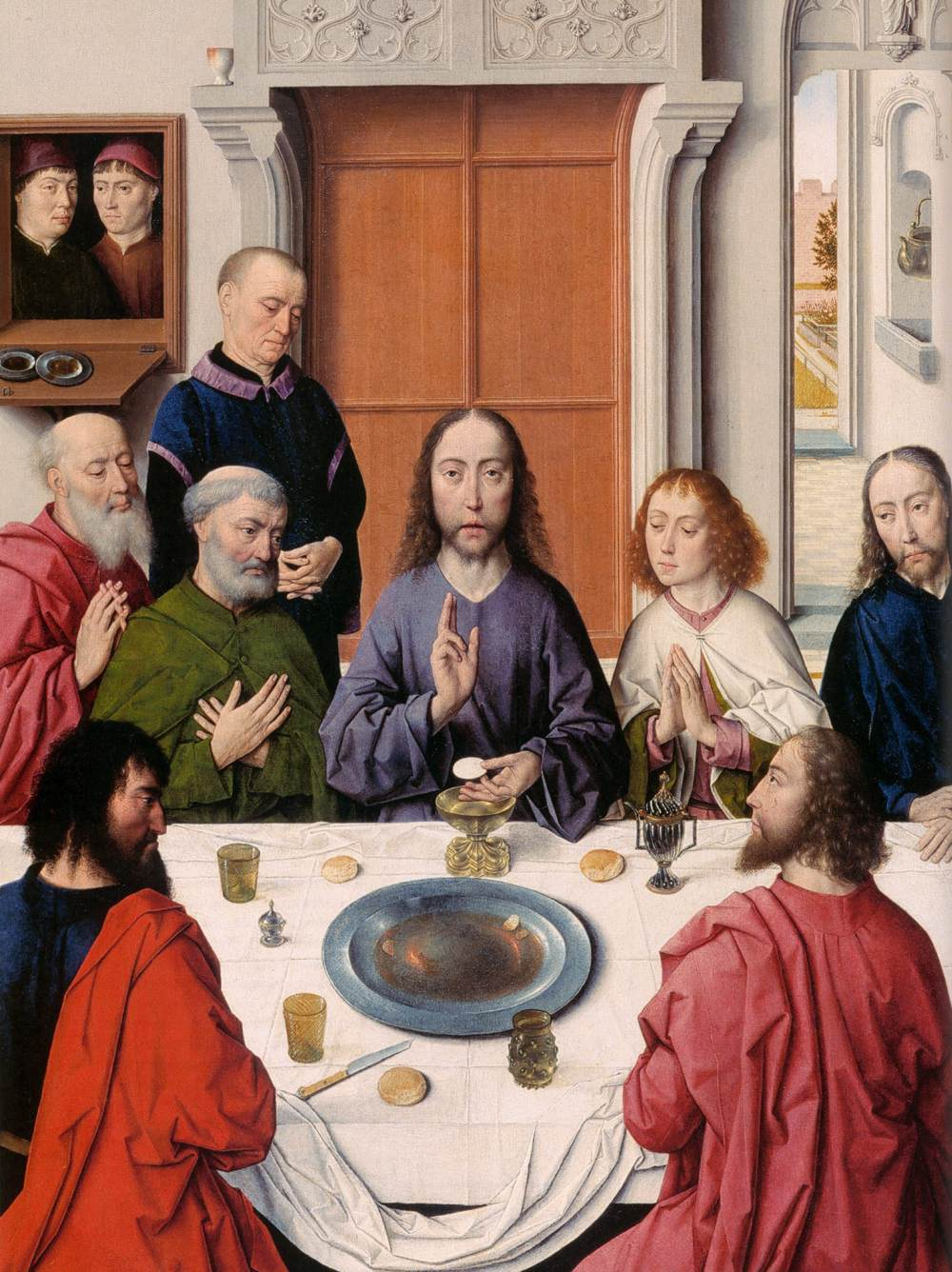
The Last Supper, Dirk Bouts (detail)

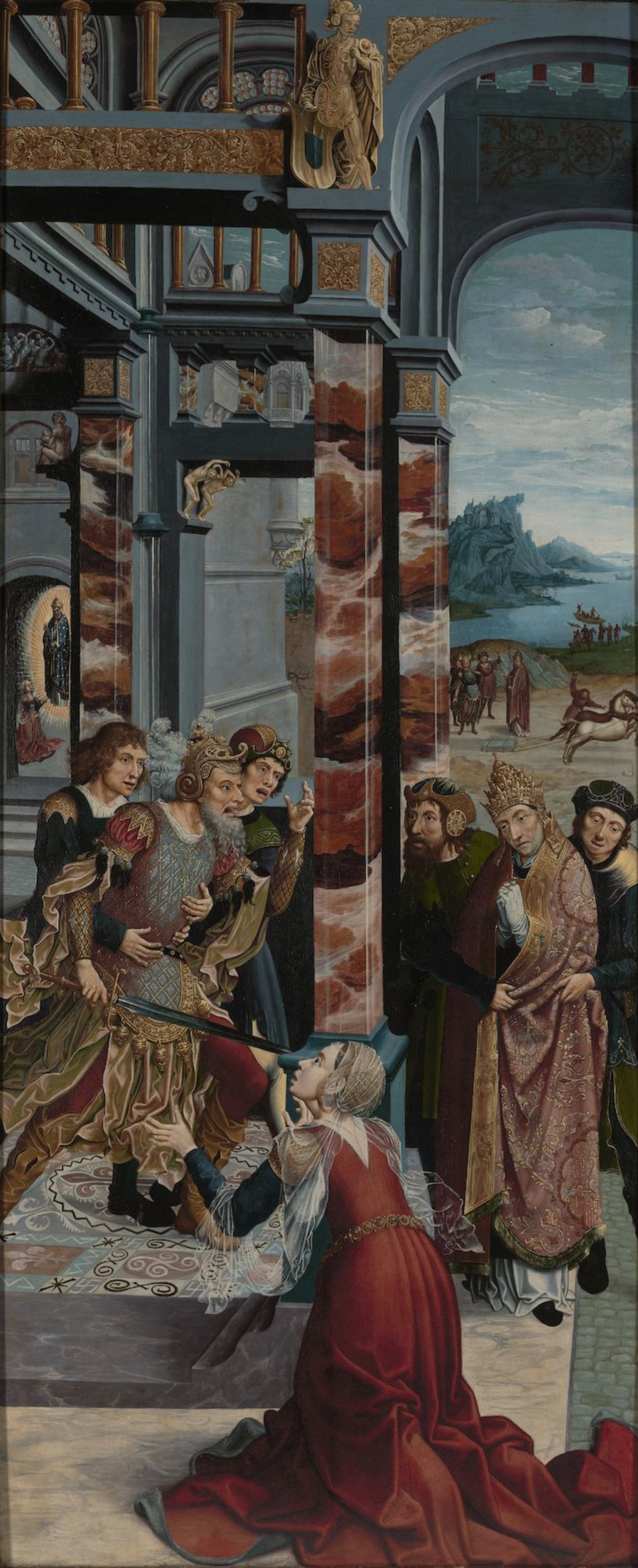
Scenes from the Life and Martyrdom of Saint Catherine, Jan Rombouts the Elder

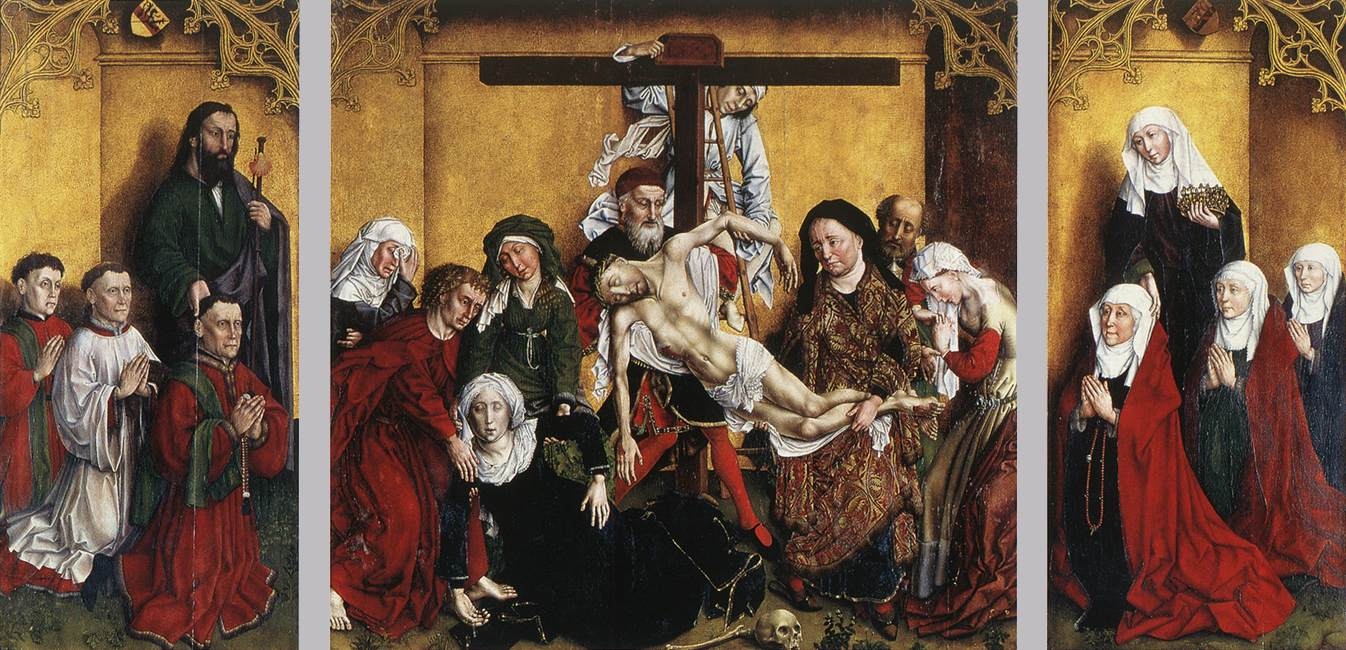
Edelheere Altarpiece, after Rogier van der Weyden

== See also ==
- Triumphal Cross (Jan Borman)
