= Leuven =

Capital of Flemish Brabant province, Belgium

Leuven: Louvain (French)
- City and municipality
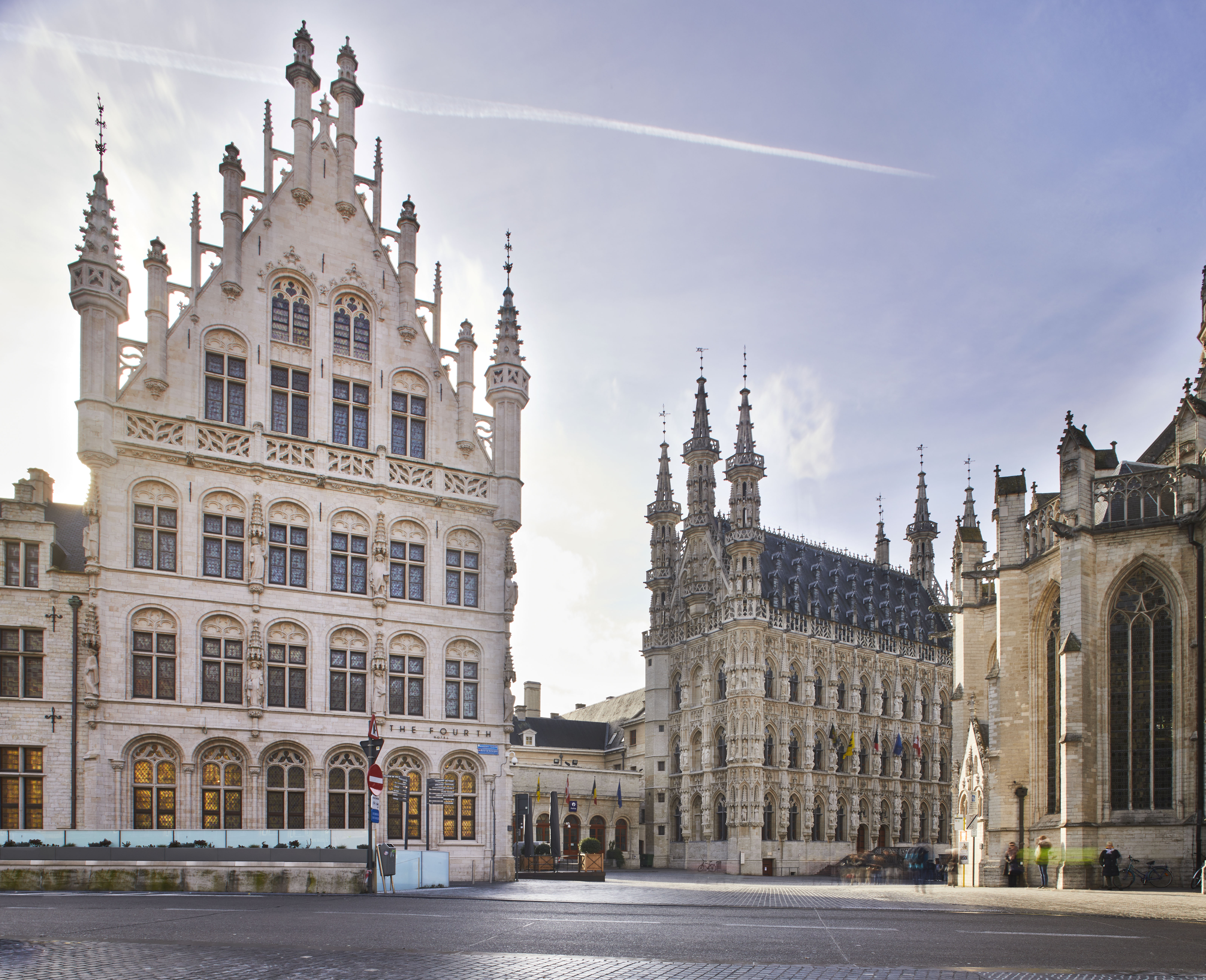
- Leuven Town Hall in 2019

- Flag Coat of arms

- Location of Leuven in Flemish Brabant
- Interactive map of Leuven
- Location in Belgium
- Coordinates: 50°53′N 04°42′E
- Country: Belgium
- Community: Flemish Community
- Region: Flemish Region
- Province: Flemish Brabant
- Arrondissement: Leuven

Government
  - Mayor: Mohamed Ridouani (Vooruit)
  - Governing parties: Vooruit, Groen, CD&V

Area
  - Total: 57.51 km^{2} (22.20 sq mi)

Population (2021-01-01)
  - Total: 101,032
  - Density: 1,757/km^{2} (4,550/sq mi)
- Demonym: Leuvenaar
- Postal codes: 3000, 3001, 3010, 3012, 3018
- NIS code: 24062
- Area codes: 016
- Website: www.leuven.be
- Logo of Leuven

Leuven (UK: /ˈlɜːvən/, US: /ˈlʌvən/; Dutch: [ˈløːvə(n)]), also called Louvain (/luːˈvæ̃/, US also /luːˈveɪn/, French: [luvɛ̃]), is the capital and largest city of the province of Flemish Brabant in the Flemish Region of Belgium. A Dutch-speaking municipality, it is located about 25 kilometres (16 miles) east of Brussels. The municipality itself comprises the sub-municipalities of Heverlee, Kessel-Lo, Leuven proper, Wilsele, and Wijgmaal and parts of Haasrode and Korbeek-Lo. It is the eighth largest city in Belgium, with more than 100,244 inhabitants.

Leuven has been a university city since 1425. This makes it the oldest university city in the Low Countries. KU Leuven, the largest Dutch-speaking university in the world and the largest university in the Low Countries (and thus also Belgium's largest university), has its flagship campus in Leuven.

The city is home of the headquarters of Anheuser-Busch InBev, the world's largest beer brewer and sixth-largest fast-moving consumer goods company.

== History ==
=== Middle Ages ===
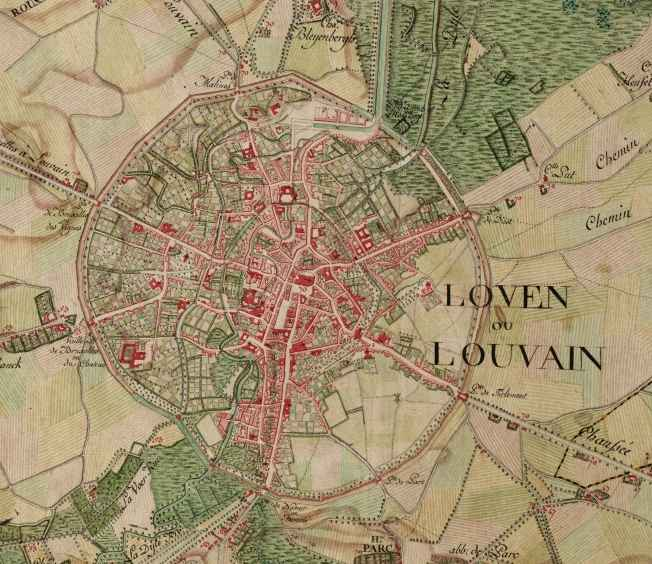
"Loven ou Louvain" on the Ferraris map (around 1775)

The earliest mention of Leuven (Loven) dates from 891, when a Viking army was defeated by the Frankish king Arnulf of Carinthia (see: Battle of Leuven). According to a legend, the city's red and white arms depict the blood-stained shores of the river Dyle after this battle, similarly to the flag of Austria and the flag of Latvia.

Situated beside this river, and near to the stronghold of the Dukes of Brabant, Leuven became the most important centre of trade in the duchy between the 11th and 14th centuries. A token of its former importance as a centre of cloth manufacture is shown in that ordinary linen cloth was known, in late-14th-century and 15th-century texts, as lewyn (other spellings: Leuwyn, Levyne, Lewan(e), Lovanium, Louvain).

=== Early modern period ===
In the 15th century, a new golden era began with the founding of the largest and oldest university in the Low Countries, the University of Leuven, in 1425. Prestigious buildings like the Town Hall and the Saint Peter's Church (itself designated a UNESCO World Heritage Site in 1999) were constructed. The art of painting flourished with painters such as Dirk Bouts, Albrecht Bouts and Jan Rombouts the Elder. The painter Quinten Metsys was born and trained in Leuven.

By the turn of the 16th century, Leuven had become a major European center for art and knowledge with humanists like Erasmus and Hieronymus van Busleyden working there. In 1517 the latter founded the Collegium Trilingue in which the three ancient languages: Latin, Greek and Hebrew were taught. It promoted the critical study of classical literature and the Bible. Thomas More published his Utopia at Dirk Martens printing house in Leuven in 1516. Gemma Frisius laid the foundation for modern triangulation methods and cartography. He further made important contributions to mathematics, geography and astronomy. Gerardus Mercator and John Dee were among his students. Leuven became a leading centre for the fabrication of precision astronomical instruments, such as the planetaria and the terrestrial and celestial globes built by Gaspard van der Heyden and Gualterus Arsenius. Andreas Vesalius completed his medicine studies in Leuven, before moving to Padova and Basel. Religious persecutions of Protestants, followed by greater religious and political turmoil starting in the late 1560s, greatly affected intellectual life in Leuven. Many professors and alumni from Leuven moved abroad. The newly founded University of Leiden in Holland, amongst others, would profit greatly from this brain drain. Despite this the university continued to excel in disciplines like theology with Johannes Molanus and classical studies with Justus Lipsius.

=== 18th–19th centuries ===
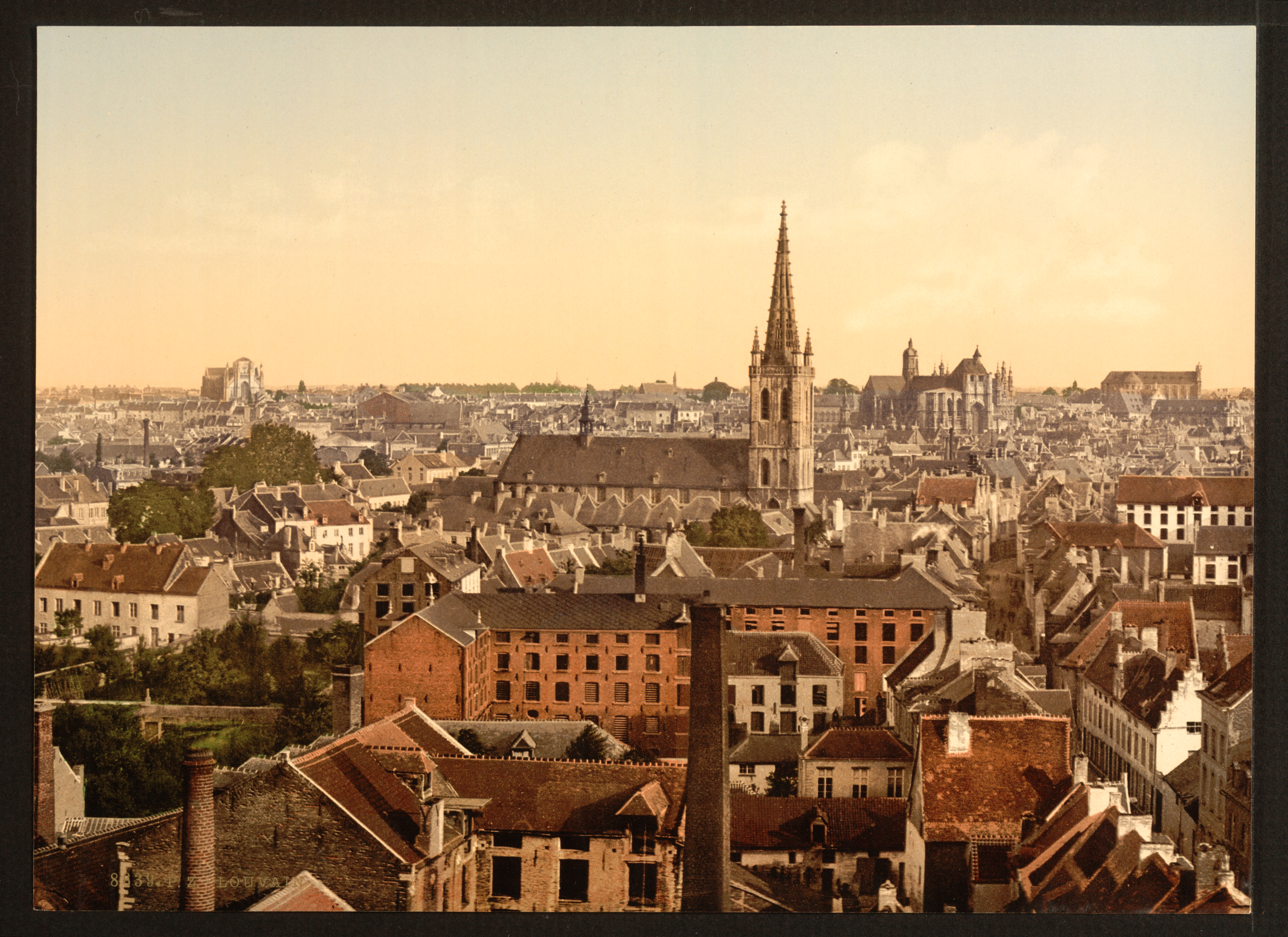
View over Leuven, late 19th century

In the 18th century, the brewery Den Horn (meaning "the horn") flourished. In 1708, Sebastien Artois became the master brewer at Den Horn, and gave his name to the brewery in 1717, now part of AB InBev, whose flagship beer, Stella Artois, is brewed in Leuven and sold in many countries.

Leuven developed considerably during the 19th century. Dozens of squares were created, including the Sint-Jacobsplein, the Volksplaats (today's Ladeuzeplein) and the Statieplein (today's Martelarenplein). From 1835, the streets of the city were lit with gas. The Voer stream was vaulted, the channels occupying the middle of the streets were removed, a number of narrow streets were widened or simply destroyed and a considerable number of sewers were installed. The municipal theatre and the main post office were built, respectively in 1866 and between 1893 and 1895. It was also at this time that the central prison was built.

=== 20th century ===
==== World War I ====
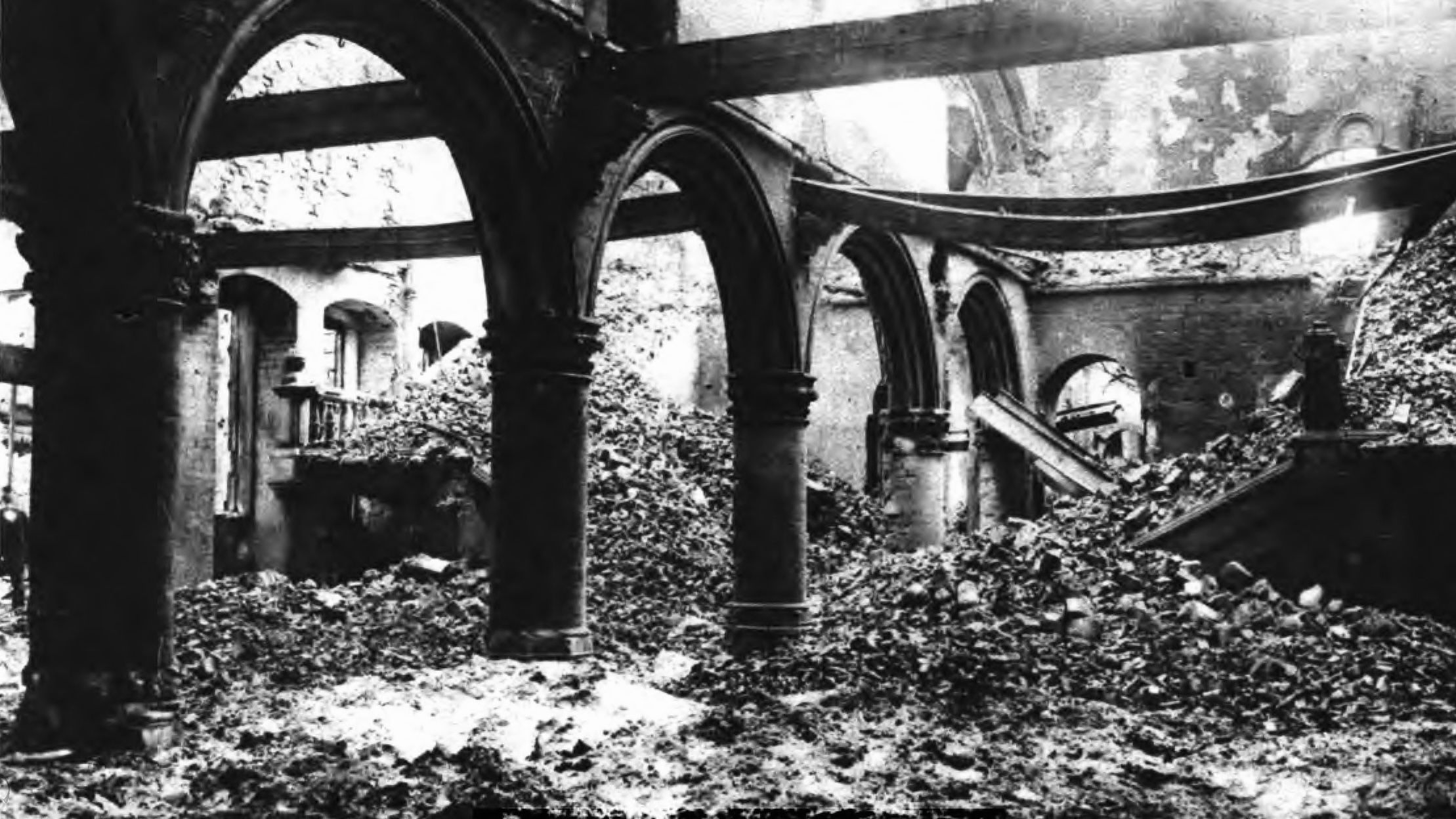
The ruins of the Catholic University of Leuven's library after it was burned by the German army in 1914

Leuven has several times been besieged or occupied by foreign armies; these include the Battle of Leuven (891), the Siege of Leuven (1635) and the Battle of Leuven (1831). In the 20th century, both world wars inflicted major damage upon the city. Upon Germany's entry into World War I, the town was heavily damaged by rampaging soldiers. In all, about 300 civilians died. The university library was destroyed on 25 August 1914, using petrol and incendiary pastilles. Approximately 230,000 volumes were lost in the destruction, including Gothic and Renaissance manuscripts, a collection of 750 medieval manuscripts, and more than 1,000 incunabula (books printed before 1501). The German atrocities and the cultural destruction caused worldwide outrage. The burning of the city was done as a reprisal, which at the time was legal under international law, as the Germans alleged that Belgian civilians had taken part in the fighting and killed German troops. The old library building was rebuilt after the war, and much of the collection was replaced. A new, dedicated Central Library was built on the square now known as Ladeuzeplein; it was officially opened on 4 July 1928.

==== World War II ====
In World War II, after the start of the German offensive, Leuven formed part of the British Expeditionary Force's front line and was defended by units of the 3rd Division and Belgian troops. From 14 to 16 May 1940, the German Army Group B assaulted the city with heavy air and artillery support. The British withdrew their forces to the River Senne on the night of 16 May and the town was occupied the next day. The new university library building was set on fire by shelling, on 16 May, and nearly a million books were lost.

In September 1942, the Stalag 304 prisoner-of-war camp was relocated from Zeithain to Leuven. It housed Soviet, Belgian and Serbian POWs. In 1945, the camp was moved to Trieste.

== Climate ==
Climate data for Leuven (1991–2020)
Month	Jan	Feb	Mar	Apr	May	Jun	Jul	Aug	Sep	Oct	Nov	Dec	Year
Mean daily maximum °C (°F)	6.6 (43.9)	7.7 (45.9)	11.6 (52.9)	15.9 (60.6)	19.5 (67.1)	22.3 (72.1)	24.4 (75.9)	24.1 (75.4)	20.5 (68.9)	15.6 (60.1)	10.4 (50.7)	7.0 (44.6)	15.5 (59.9)
Daily mean °C (°F)	3.9 (39.0)	4.4 (39.9)	7.2 (45.0)	10.4 (50.7)	14.1 (57.4)	17.1 (62.8)	19.2 (66.6)	18.8 (65.8)	15.5 (59.9)	11.6 (52.9)	7.4 (45.3)	4.5 (40.1)	11.2 (52.2)
Mean daily minimum °C (°F)	1.2 (34.2)	1.0 (33.8)	2.8 (37.0)	4.9 (40.8)	8.8 (47.8)	11.9 (53.4)	14.0 (57.2)	13.5 (56.3)	10.5 (50.9)	7.5 (45.5)	4.3 (39.7)	1.9 (35.4)	6.9 (44.4)
Average precipitation mm (inches)	70.4 (2.77)	62.2 (2.45)	54.5 (2.15)	43.3 (1.70)	55.5 (2.19)	67.3 (2.65)	72.7 (2.86)	79.5 (3.13)	60.5 (2.38)	62.8 (2.47)	68.5 (2.70)	83.5 (3.29)	780.7 (30.74)
Average precipitation days (≥ 1 mm)	12.7	11.6	11.1	8.9	9.6	9.6	10.0	10.2	9.8	10.6	11.8	13.6	129.4
Mean monthly sunshine hours	59	74	129	181	210	211	217	204	160	117	66	50	1,678
Source: KMI/IRM

== Economy ==
Given the presence of the KU Leuven, Europe's most innovative university according to Reuters, much of the local economy is concentrated on spin-offs from academic research. In addition, the Leuven-based research centre, IMEC, is a research centre in the field of nano-electronics and digital technologies. As a result, dozens of companies in high technological fields such as biotech, robotics, additive manufacturing and IT, are located near these research institutes on the Arenberg Science Park and Haasrode Research-Park. Quite a few international companies such as Siemens, Huawei, Nitto Denko, JSR Corporation or Commscope have important, often research oriented branches, in Leuven. The academic hospital UZ Leuven, first in Europe regarding the number of clinical tests per capita and approval rates for clinical trials, UZ Leuven is another advanced research institute. It is one of Europe's largest academic hospitals. As a result, large numbers of private service providers are active in the medical, financial and legal fields.

Because it is the capital of the province of Flemish Brabant, many governmental institutions are located in Leuven, as well as the regional headquarters of transport corporations such as De Lijn. As one of Flanders Art-Cities, with a large range of cafés, restaurants, cultural institutions and shopping neighbourhoods, Leuven also attracts a growing number of tourists.

Leuven is the worldwide headquarters of Anheuser-Busch InBev, the largest beer company in the world and is considered one of the largest fast-moving consumer goods (FMCG) companies in the world. InBev's Stella Artois brewery and main offices dominate the entire north-eastern part of the town, between the railway station and the canal to Mechelen. Finally, Leuven is the ancestral home of the KBC Group. KBC is one of the leading financial groups in Europe. It is a multi-channel bank-insurance group, with a geographic focus on Belgium and Central Europe, catering mainly to retail clients, SMEs and local midcaps. As one of the largest companies in Belgium and it has its insurance and auto lease HQ in Leuven.

== Demographics ==
As of 1 January 2024, the population of Leuven was 104,009. The arrondissement of Leuven counted 527,443 in January 2024.

The city itself is made up out of the centre of Leuven (30,313), Kessel-Lo (29,147), Heverlee (22,521), Wilsele (9,786) and Wijgmaal (3,592).

=== Student population ===
Leuven has a large international student population, mainly concentrated around the city centre. The Katholieke Universiteit Leuven (KU Leuven; University of Leuven) has three campuses in the city, with a total of more than 50,000 students as of June 2024. It is the oldest Catholic university still in existence in the world, and the largest university in Belgium. There are also a number of hogescholen (universities of applied sciences), such as the UC Leuven-Limburg (UCLL).

== Transport ==
Within the city and its immediate surroundings, most distances can be covered on foot or with a bicycle. Several streets are off-limits to vehicle traffic and, within the city centre, road speed regulations prescribe 30 km/h (19 mph) as the maximum speed limit, making it a pedestrian and bicycle-friendly city. There are also a few car parking lots.

There are numerous buses, primarily operated by the public transport company De Lijn, that connect the city with the region while providing travel options within the city centre. The so-called Ringbus follows the ring road of the city. Buses 91 and 616 connect Leuven with Brussels Airport.

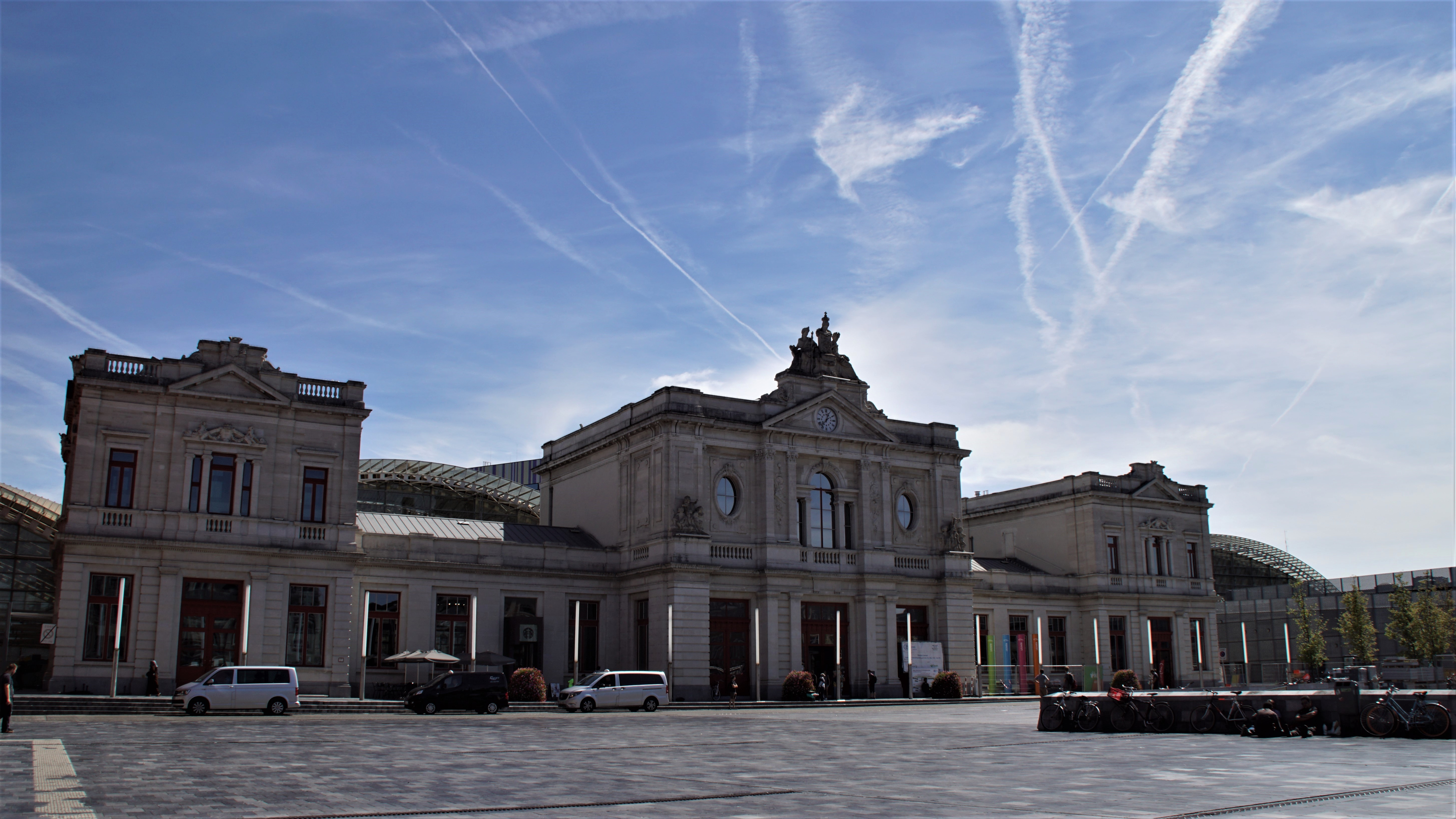
Leuven railway station

Leuven railway station is located on the NMBS railway lines 35 (Leuven–Aarschot–Hasselt), 36 (Brussels–Liège), 36N (Schaerbeek–Leuven), 53 (Schellebelle–Leuven), and 139 (Leuven–Ottignies). In Bierbeek, south-east of Leuven, lies the beginning of HSL 2, the high-speed railway towards Liège.

The European route E40 passes Leuven in the south, the European route E314 connects Leuven with the city of Aachen.

== Politics ==
=== Mayor ===
After the municipal election on 13 October 2024, the Vooruit party strengthens its position. The governing coalition of Leuven will continue working together which consists of Vooruit (23 out of 47 seats), Groen (5 seats) and CD&V (7 seats), with Vooruit providing the mayor with Mohamed Ridouani. The opposition is composed of N-VA (10 seats), PVDA (1 seat) and Vlaams Belang (1 seat).

== Culture ==
One of Belgium's conservatories is based in Leuven: the Lemmens Institute, which is described as "Faculty of Music, Performing Arts and Education". It is known for its music therapy education and its wordart-drama education. Kunstencentrum STUK is a cultural center and venue in the city center for music, theatre, sound art, and dance. Leuven holds a summer rock festival, Marktrock. Leuven has some university orchestras, such as the University Symphony Orchestra (USO), the University Symphonic Band (UHO). and the Arenberg Orchestra.

In September 2009, the M – Museum Leuven opened in Leuven. It is a museum for both contemporary and historical art, located near het Ladeuzeplein. It has hosted exhibitions by international artists such as Angus Fairhurst, Sol LeWitt, Roe Ethridge, and Charles Burns, as well as Belgian artists such as Ilse D'Hollander, Jan Vercruysse, Antoon Van Dyck, and Freek Wambacq.

The steady growth in cultural appeal over the last few decades has led to an increasing number of tourists. This is most likely to rise as Leuven will become Europe's Capital of Culture in 2030, together with many of its neighboring municipalities (LOV2030 - Leuven & Beyond).

Leuven has a rich beer culture, being the birthplace of several beers such as Stella Artois, Leuvense Tripel, Domus and Keizersberg. It has several bars priding themselves in offering a wide variety of local and international beers, including a bar that claims to offer more than 3000 different beers, next to brewpubs and brown cafés.

The Higher Institute of Philosophy holds the archives of the German philosopher Edmund Husserl.

== Sport ==
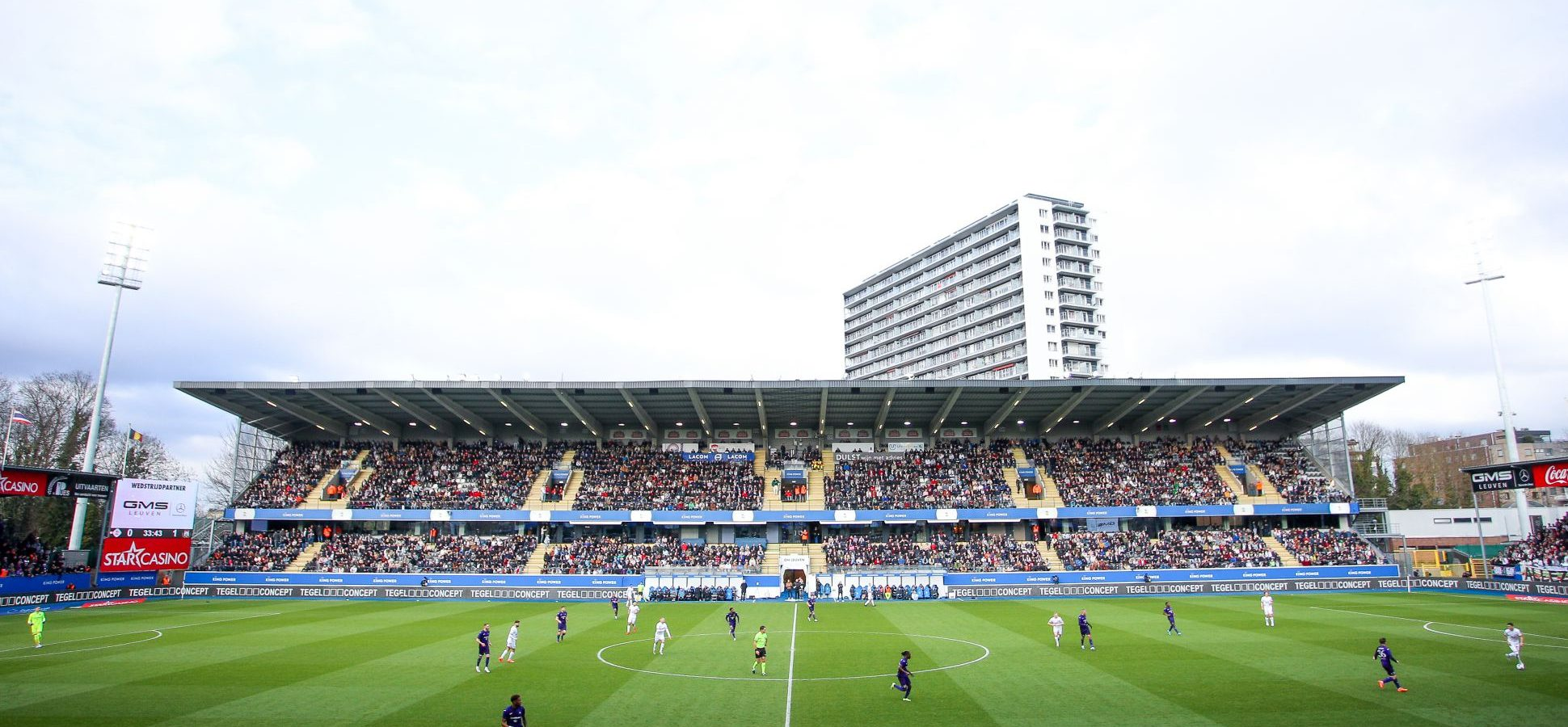
Den Dreef Stadium

Leuven was voted European City of Sport for 2021, highlighted by hosting the UCI Road World Championships, which will follow several routes of the Grote Prijs Jef Scherens, a yearly cycling race in and around Leuven. The city also hosts the start of the Brabantse Pijl, a semi-classic race and the Cyclocross Leuven is a cyclo-cross race held each year in January.

The main football club of the municipality is Oud-Heverlee Leuven, successor of prior clubs Daring Club Leuven and Stade Leuven. Both the men's team and OH Leuven women play at the highest level. The city's prime basketball team is the Leuven Bears, they play their home games at the SportOase. Other known top-tier teams include IHC Leuven (ice hockey), KHC Leuven (field hockey), Leuven aquatics (waterpolo) and VC Haasrode-Leuven (volleyball). Daring Club Leuven Atletiek is one of the oldest athletics clubs in Belgium, where 1964 Olympic gold medallist Gaston Roelants was a member.

There is also a GAA club in Leuven, the club is named, 'the Earls of Leuven', after the Flight of the Earls. The Earls of Leuven has become one of the most well-known GAA clubs in Europe, and is an affiliated University sports club. The city of Leuven has become the home of Collegiate Gaelic Games activity in Europe due to its organisation of the 2022, 2023, and 2024 Collegiate Games. This GAA club is part of a wider European league, Gaelic Games Europe, which is in itself part of the global organisation, The Gaelic Athletic Association

== Buildings and landmarks ==
=== Secular ===
- The Town Hall, built between 1439 and 1463 by Sulpitius van Vorst, Jan II Keldermans, and following their death, Matheus de Layens, in a Brabantian late-Gothic style. In the 19th century, 236 statues were added to the exterior, each representing a prominent local scholar, artist or noble from the city's history. The reception hall dates from 1750.
- The Château of Arenberg was originally built in 16th century in the Renaissance style and was extensively renovated in the neo-Gothic style in the 19th century. The duke of Arenberg donated the domain to the Katholieke Universiteit Leuven in 1916. It is open to the public. It has a green park outside with gardens. Eggs of wild ducks can be seen around the park.
- The Keizersberg ("Caesar's" or "Emperor's hill") was the site of the Castle of Leuven around which the city of Leuven grew up, and which local legend connected with Julius Caesar. The Leuven castle was demolished in 1782 by order of Emperor Joseph II. On the east side of the same hill a commandery of the Knights Templars was built in 1187, which when the order was abolished came to the Knights Hospitallers in 1312. This was secularised by the French in 1798, when the church and larger buildings were demolished.
- The Linen Hall, in an early-Gothic style, with Baroque addition, is today the University Hall.
- The University Library on the Ladeuzeplein was built by the American architect Whitney Warren. It was a gift from the American people to Leuven after World War I, during which the Germans burned down the original library. The tower houses one of the largest carillons in the world.
- The Oude Markt or Old Market square located in the centre of Leuven features a vibrant social scene, the centre of which displays a life-size statue of 'De Kotmadam', or "The Landlady" resting on a bench.

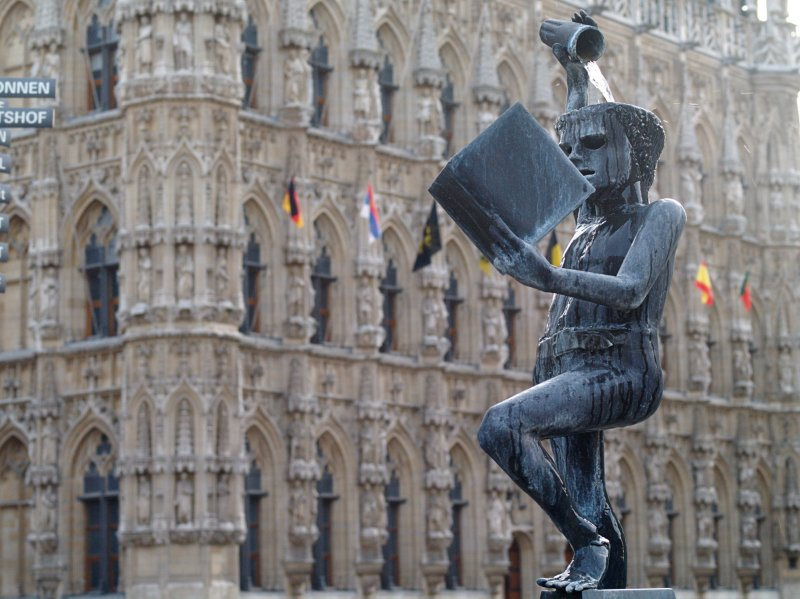
Fonske was designed by Jef Claerhout.

- Sint-Donatus Park contains remains of the medieval city wall.
- Ring walls of Leuven. Two ring walls were built around the Belgian city of Leuven during the Middle Ages: a Romanesque one from the twelfth century, and one from the fourteenth century. Leuven still has remains of the first city wall in six places, spread over a semicircle, from the north (Karel van Lotharingenstraat) to the south of the old city (Sint-Donatuspark) via the west (Handbooghof, university hospitals, Jansenius and Justus Lipsius towers, Redingenstraat). Little remains of the second, later city wall from the 14th century, with the exception of: the remains of the Verloren Kosttoren tower, the city authorities are considering options for its reconstruction, the Water Gate (nl. Waterpoort De Grote Spui), not to be confused with the Water Gate of the 12th century wall (the towers of Jansenius and Justus Lipsius), two state-protected pedestrian areas on the sites of the city fortifications, on the streets: Edouard Remyvest and Naamsevest, two houses on the site of the Brussels Gate (nl. Brusselsepoort), the outline of the ring road (R23) around Leuven.
- Totem is a statue at the centre of the Ladeuzeplein; it is a work of the Belgian artist Jan Fabre. Featuring a 23-metre (75 ft) high needle impaling a giant jewelled beetle, the statue towers over the square in front of the university library.
- Fonske is a statue near the centre of town. Its full name is Fons Sapientiae, Latin for "fountain of wisdom". The statue represents a university student who, while reading a book, lets wisdom flow into his head as liquid from a glass. Just like Manneken Pis in Brussels, Fonske is, from time to time, dressed in costumes appropriate for specific occasions.

=== Religious ===
- Saint Peter's Church (1425–1500) was finished by Jan Keldermans and Matheus de Layens. During the Second World War, the church was damaged. During the restoration, a Romanesque crypt from the 11th century was found. In the church itself, there are several paintings from the 15th to 18th centuries (among which, Dirk Bouts' famous painting of the Last Supper) and the grave of Duke Henry I of Brabant. The 50-metre (160 ft) high tower – which was meant to be 169 metres (554 ft) high, but was never completed – is home to a carillon. The tower was included in UNESCO's list of Belfries of Belgium and France in 1999.
- Saint Anthony's Chapel, Pater Damiaanplein, from the 17th to the 20th centuries, contains the tomb of Father Damien, the "leper priest" of Molokai, who was canonised by Pope Benedict XVI on Sunday 11 October 2009. The Catholic Encyclopedia calls him "the Apostle of the Lepers", and in some cases, he is known as the "leper priest". The Catholic priest's remains were returned in Belgium in 1936, after having been originally buried on the Hawaiian Island of Molokai where he had served the outcast lepers until his death.
- Saint Michael's Church of was built in the typical Jesuit Baroque style.
- Saint Quentin's Church incorporates remains of a Romanesque church built in the 13th century.
- The Great Beguinage is one of the world's best remaining examples of its architectural type. It was recognised by UNESCO as a World Heritage Site in 1998.
- Park Abbey, a 42 ha Premonstratensian abbey founded in 1129 and manufacturing site of the Parc Abbey Bible. It is one of the best preserved abbey complexes in the Low Countries and is still inhabited by a small community of Canons regular.
- Keizersberg Abbey, an active neo-Romanesque Benedictine abbey founded in 1888. It is situated on the Keizersberg ("Emperor's Mount/Hill") which used to be the location of a 12th-century the Castle of Leuven until it was demolished in 1782.
- Vlierbeek Abbey, a former Benedictine abbey founded in 1127.
- St Gertrude's Abbey, a former Augustinian abbey founded in 1206.
- Lerkeveld, a Jesuit house, student residence, and headquarters of the Society of Jesus in Belgium.
- The Al Fath mosque was built in 2016 and is used as a mosque where people can pray.
- Al Ihsaan is a government-funded mosque that was found in 1976 and that is still actively used as a place for people to pray. Al Ihsaan also offers Arabic lessons.
- There are several other smaller churches and chapels throughout the town.

=== Colleges ===
The Old University of Leuven used to have 40 constituent colleges and 4 pedagogies, some of which are still being used by KU Leuven. The most notable ones are:

- Holy Ghost College, founded in 1442, currently a residence for theology students and priests at KU Leuven.
- Collegium Trilingue, which promoted the teaching of Hebrew, Greek and Latin. It was founded in 1517 by the humanist Hieronymus Busleyden under impulse of Desiderius Erasmus and served as a model for France's Collège de France.
- Pope's College, a college for theology students of the Old University of Leuven founded by Pope Adrian VI in 1523.
- St Anthony's College, founded in 1607, was located on the Pater Damiaanplein and has been a centre of Irish learning on the European Continent since the early 17th century. The Leuven Institute for Ireland in Europe is now located on the premises.

== Gallery ==
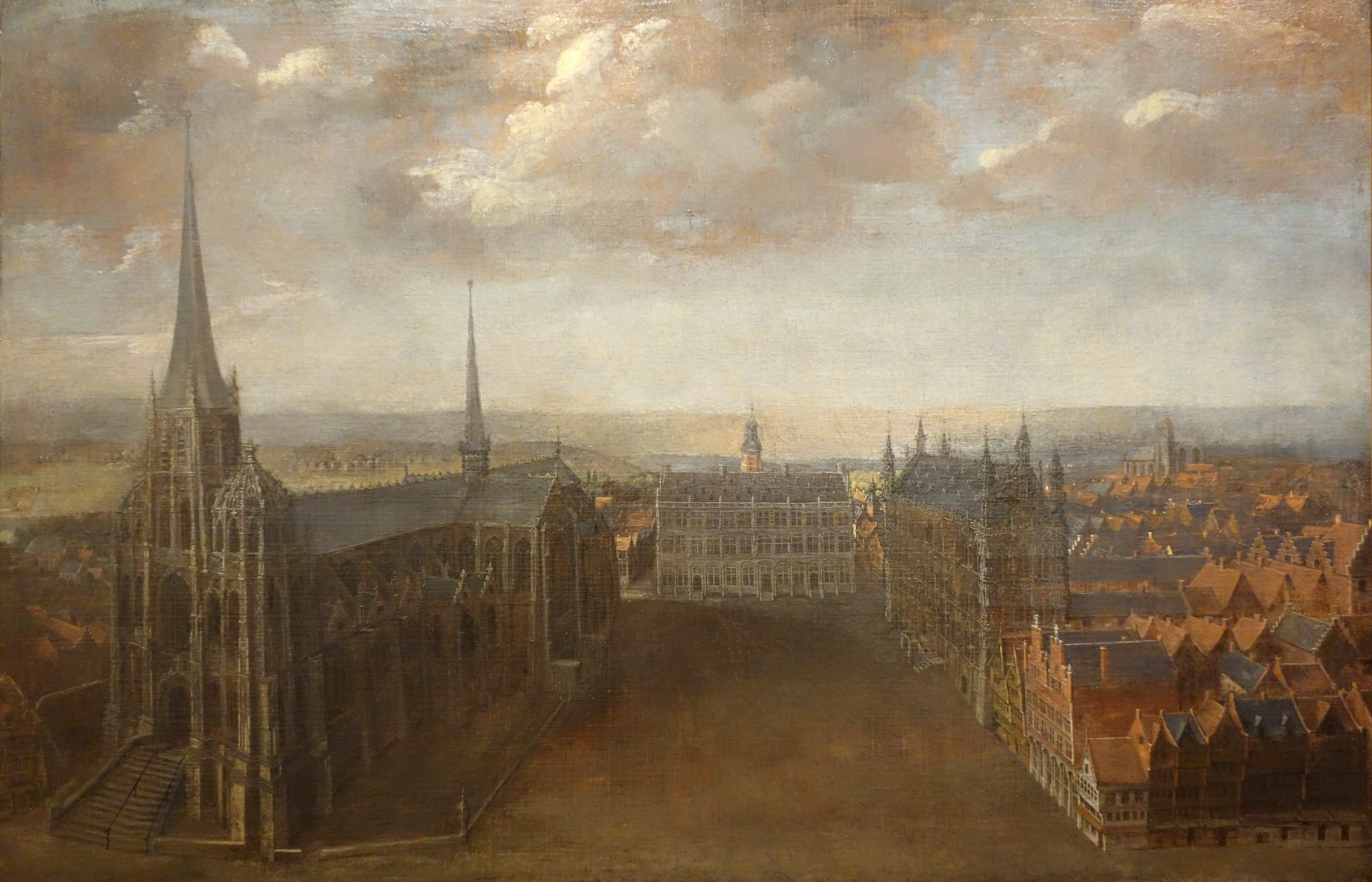
View of the Grote Markt, by Wolfgang de Smet, c. 1650–1700

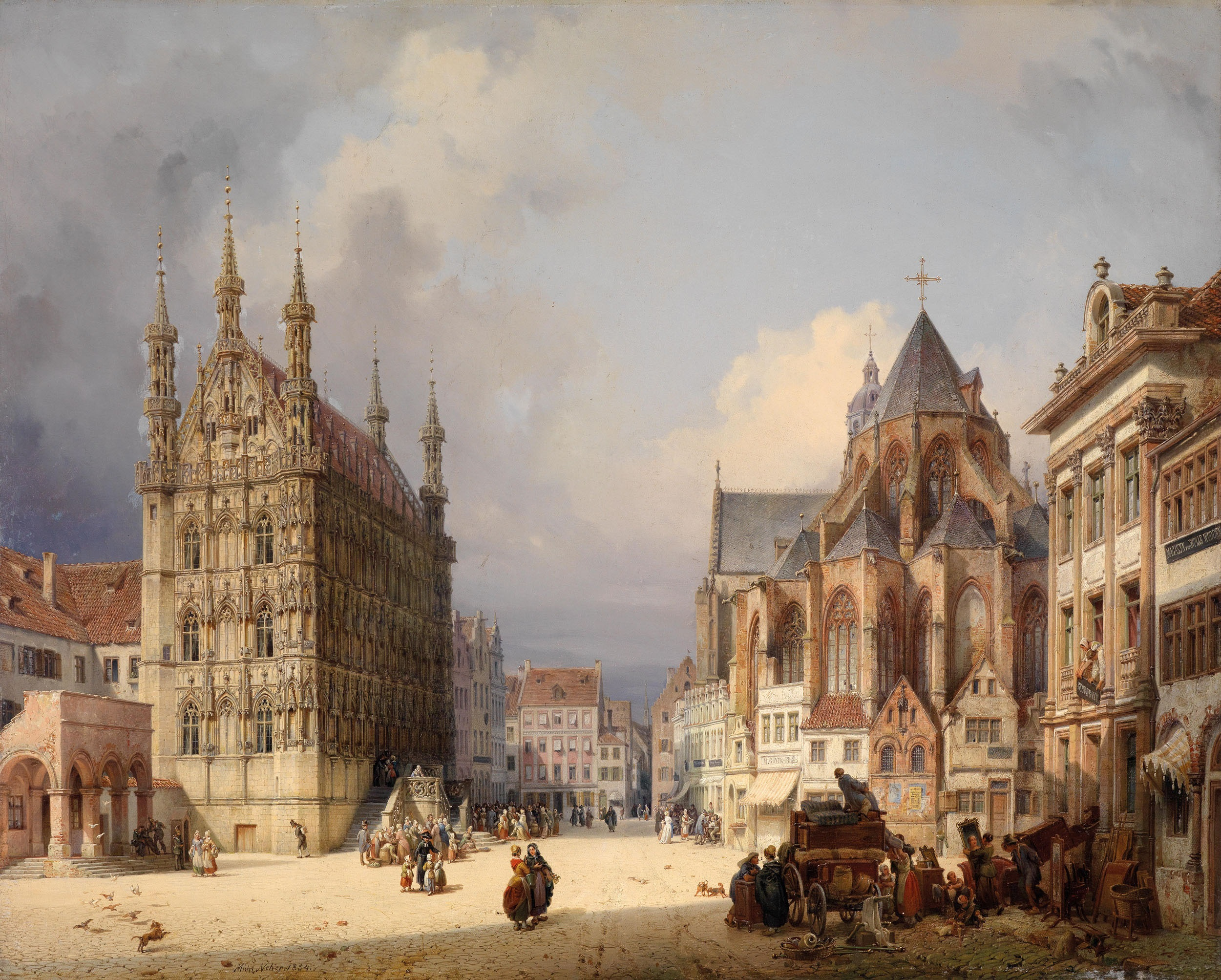
View of the Grote Markt, by Michael Neher, 1854

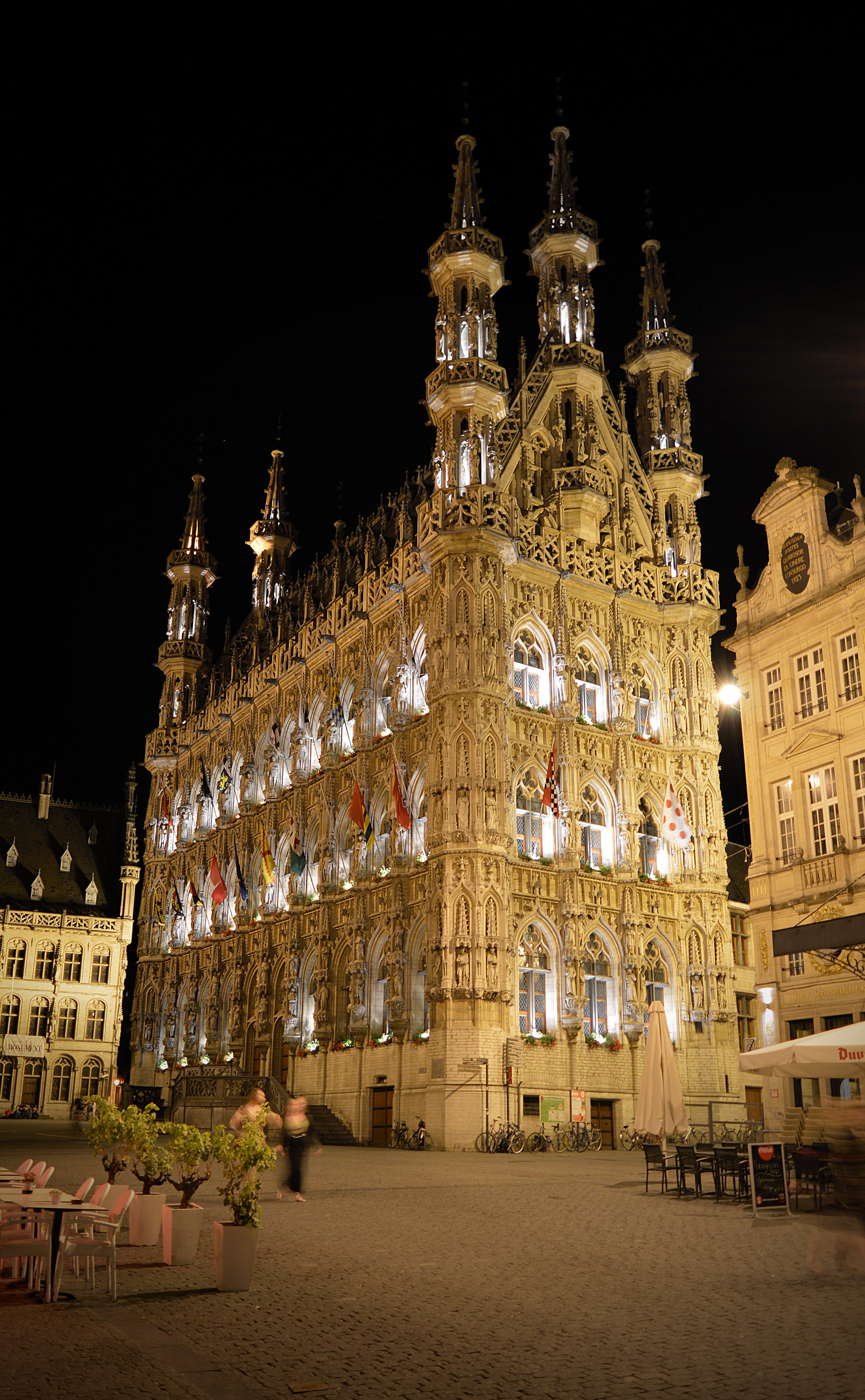
Town hall

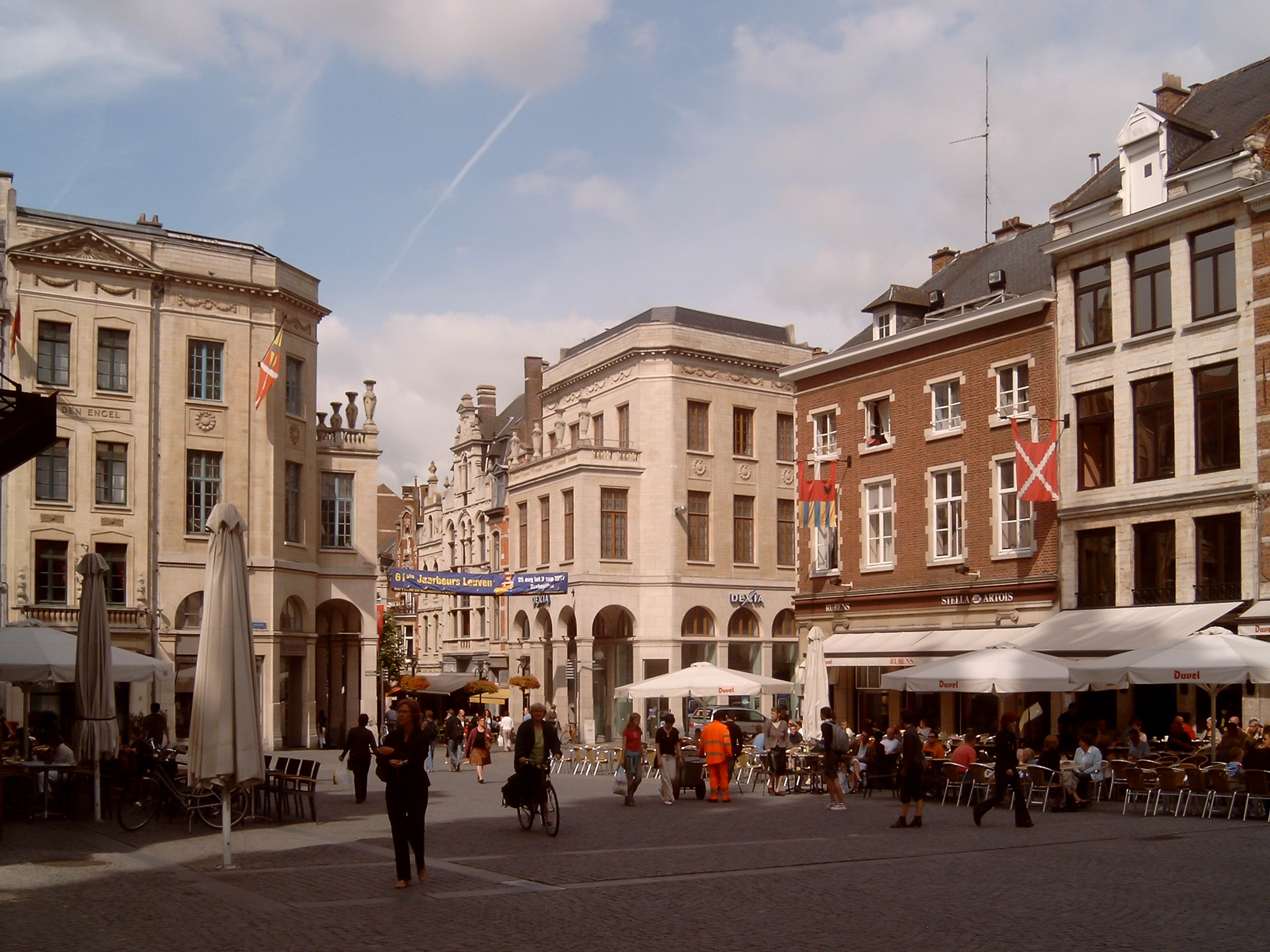
View of the Brusselsestraat from the Grote Markt

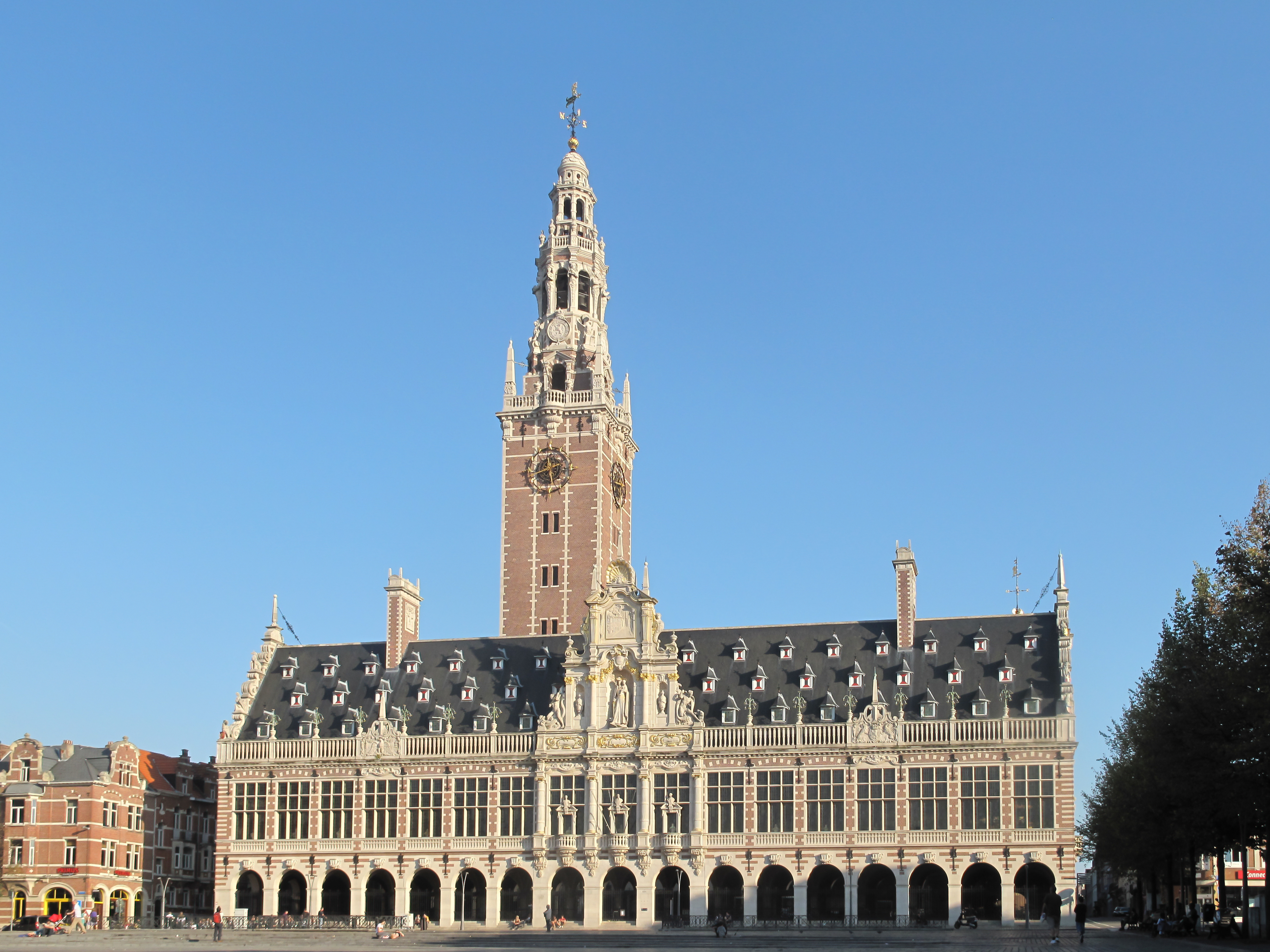
The University Library

Fonske

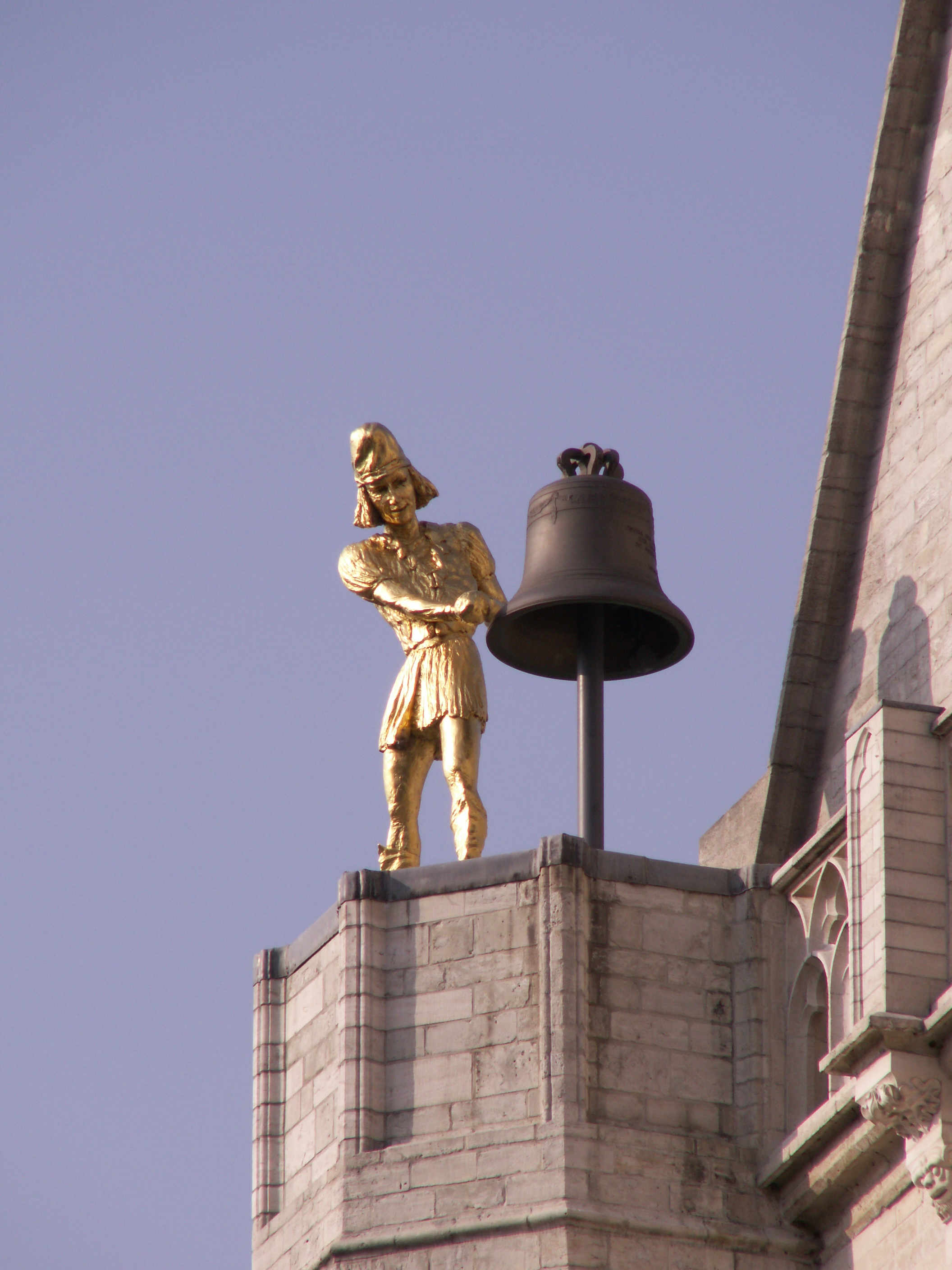
Jacquemart at the Collegiate church in Leuven

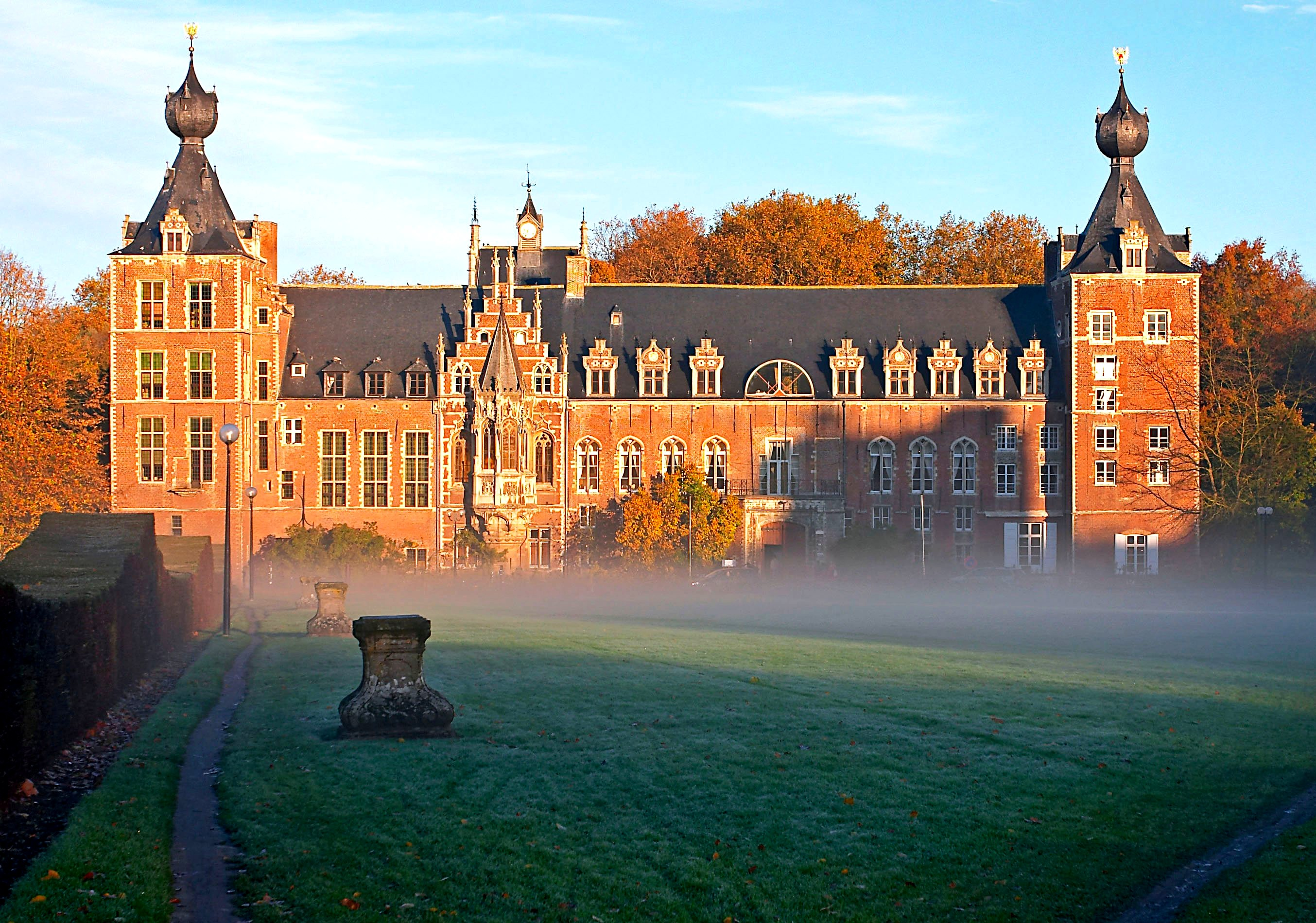
Château of Arenberg, Katholieke Universiteit Leuven

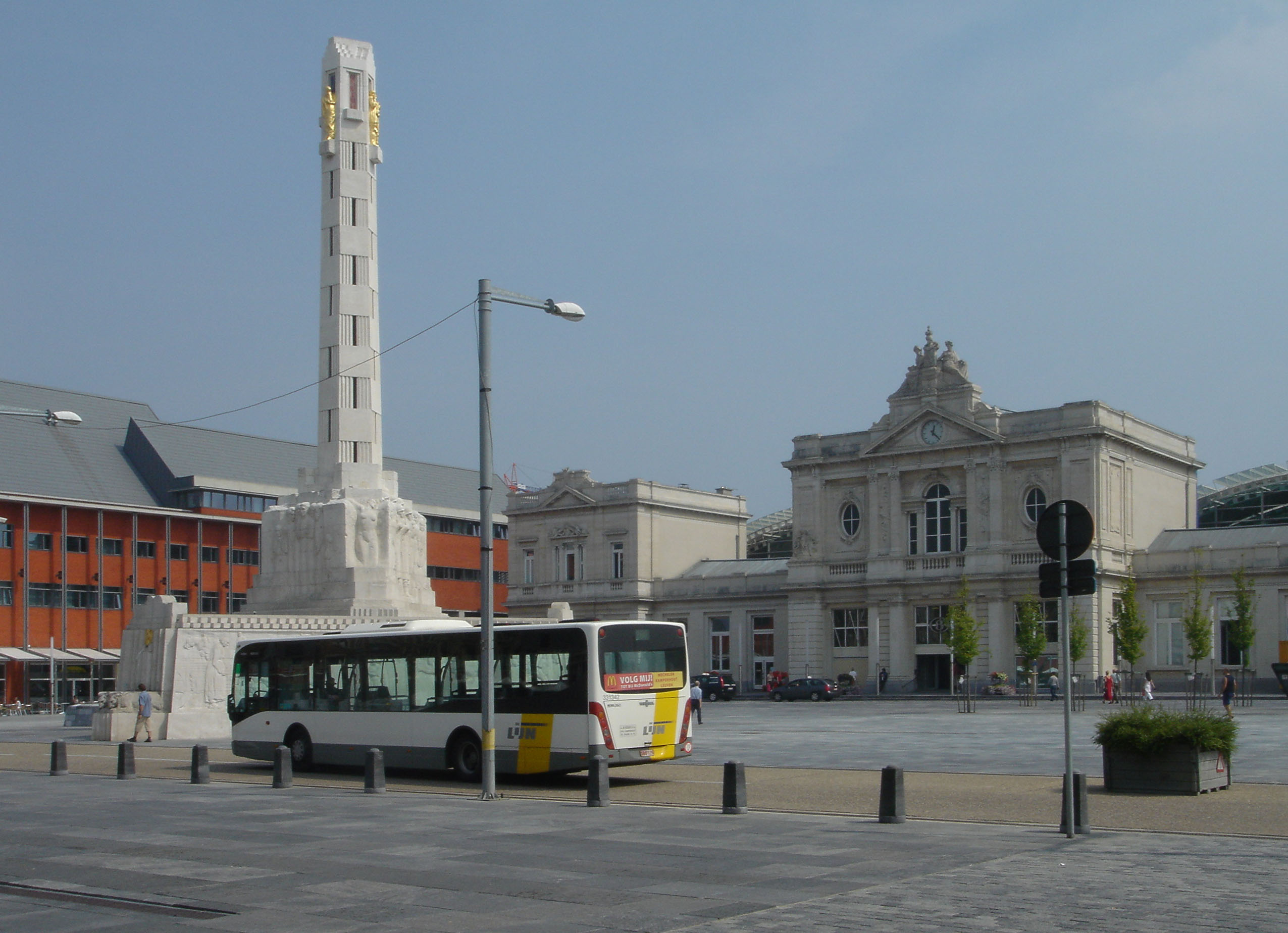
Leuven railway station

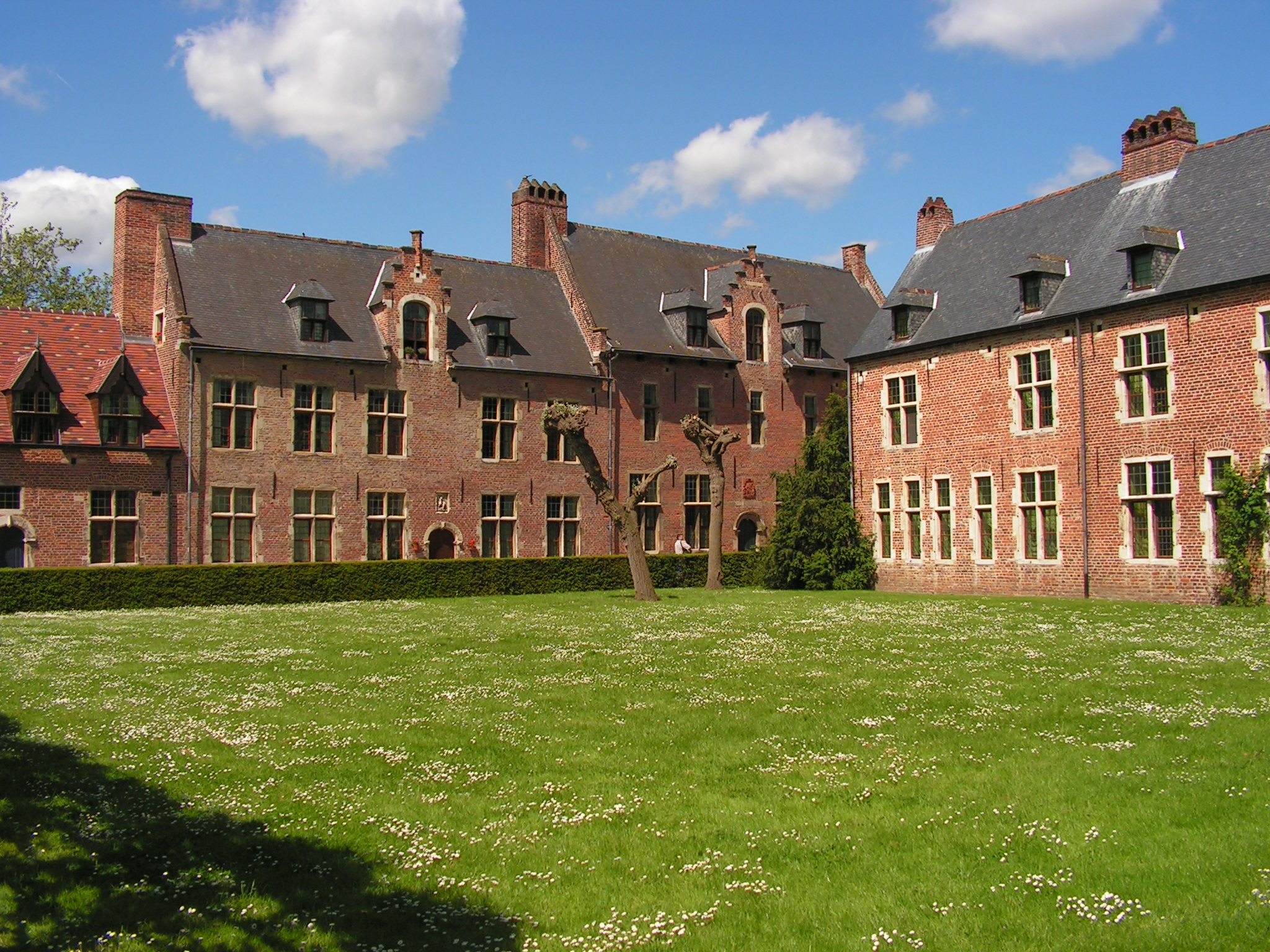
Great Beguinage

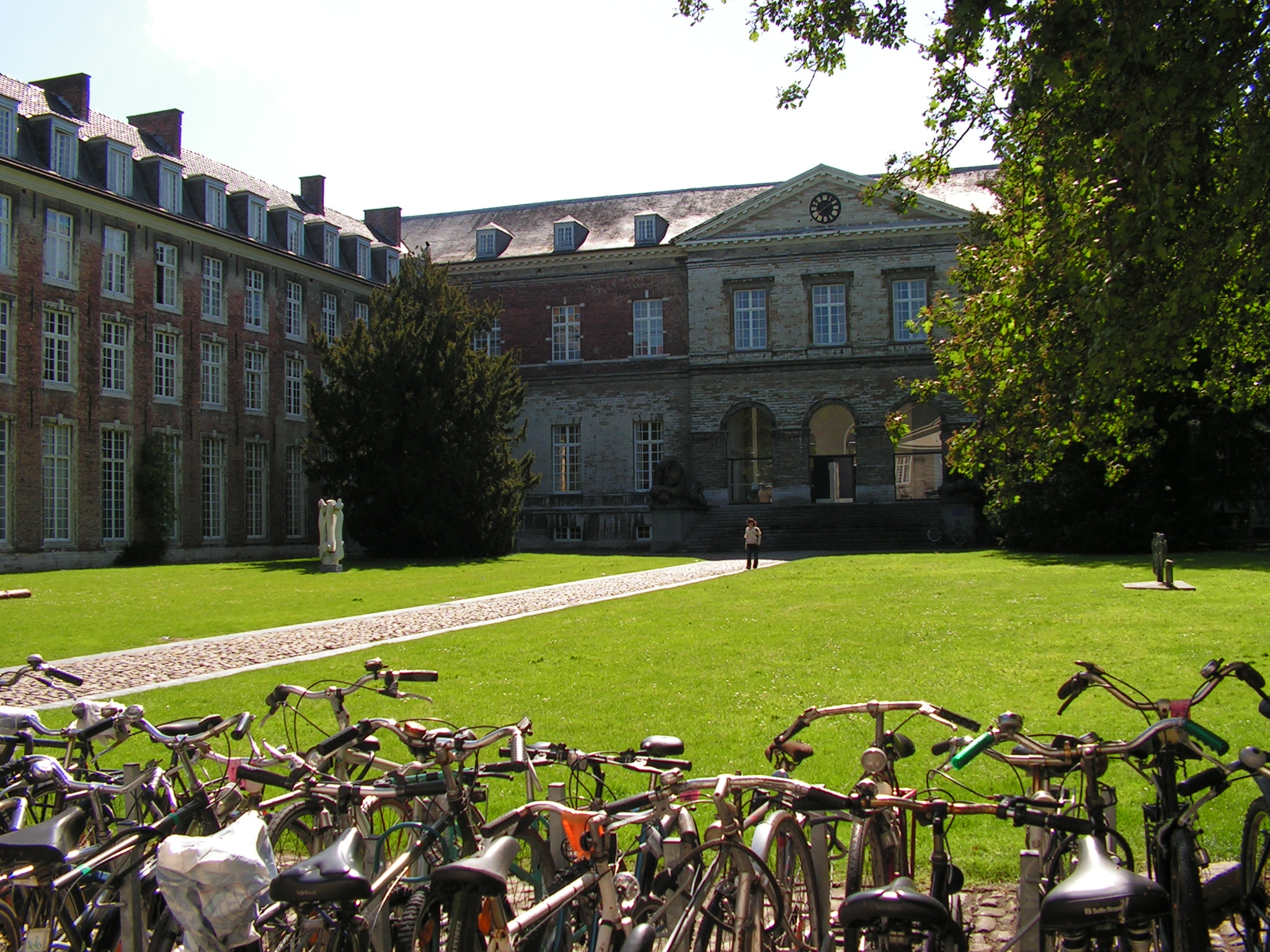
Adrian-VI College

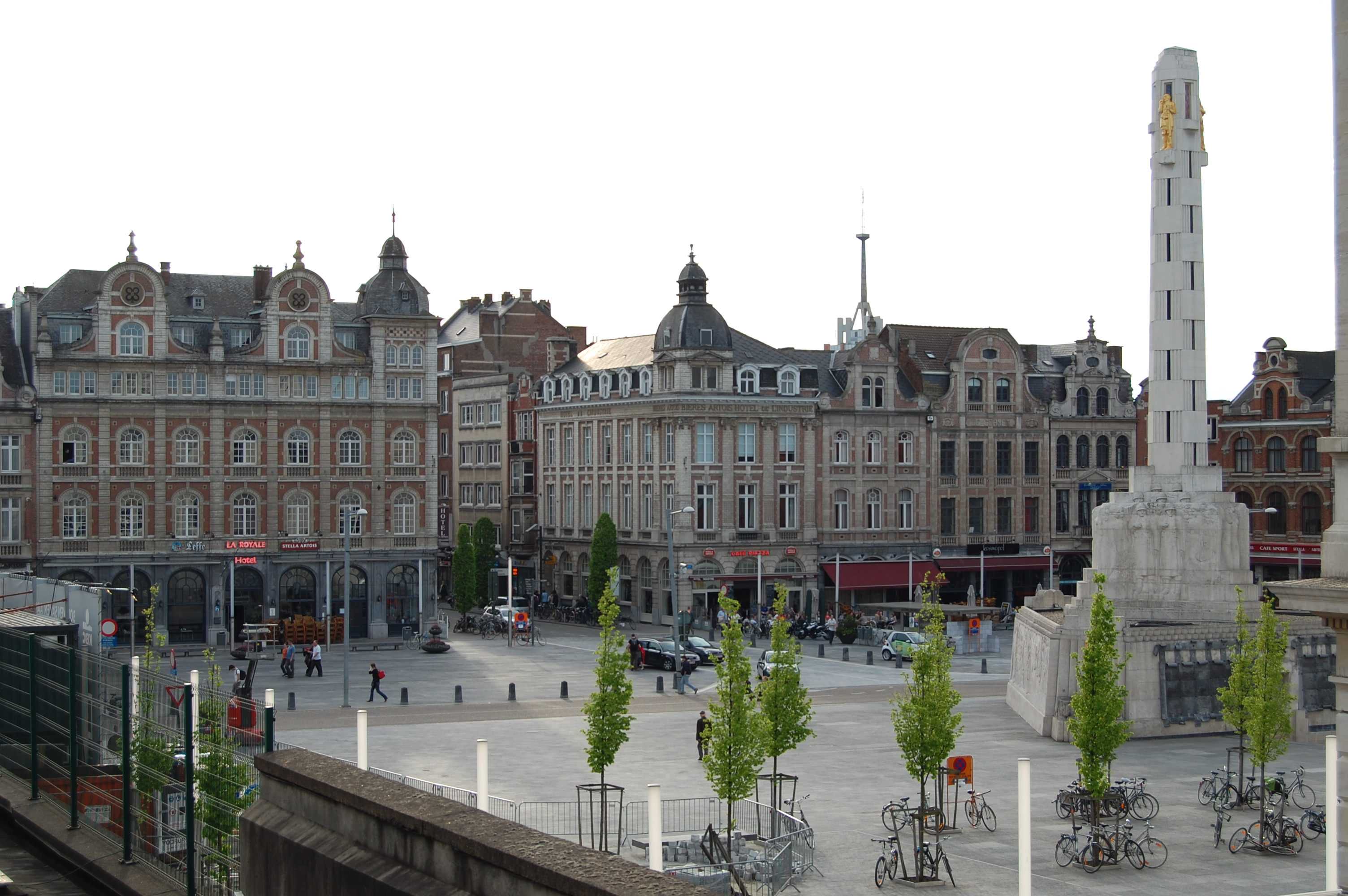
Martelarenplein

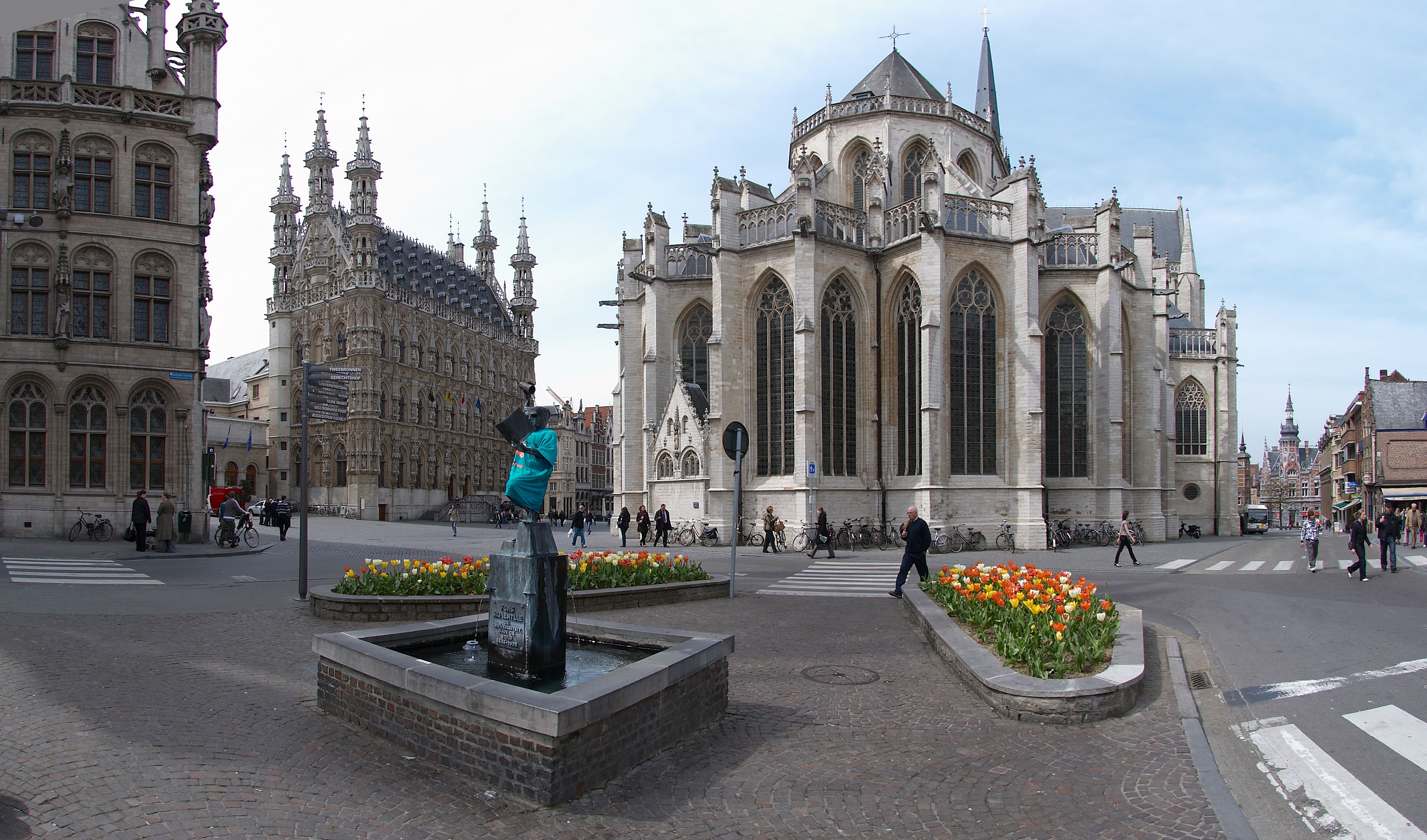
Rector De Somerplein

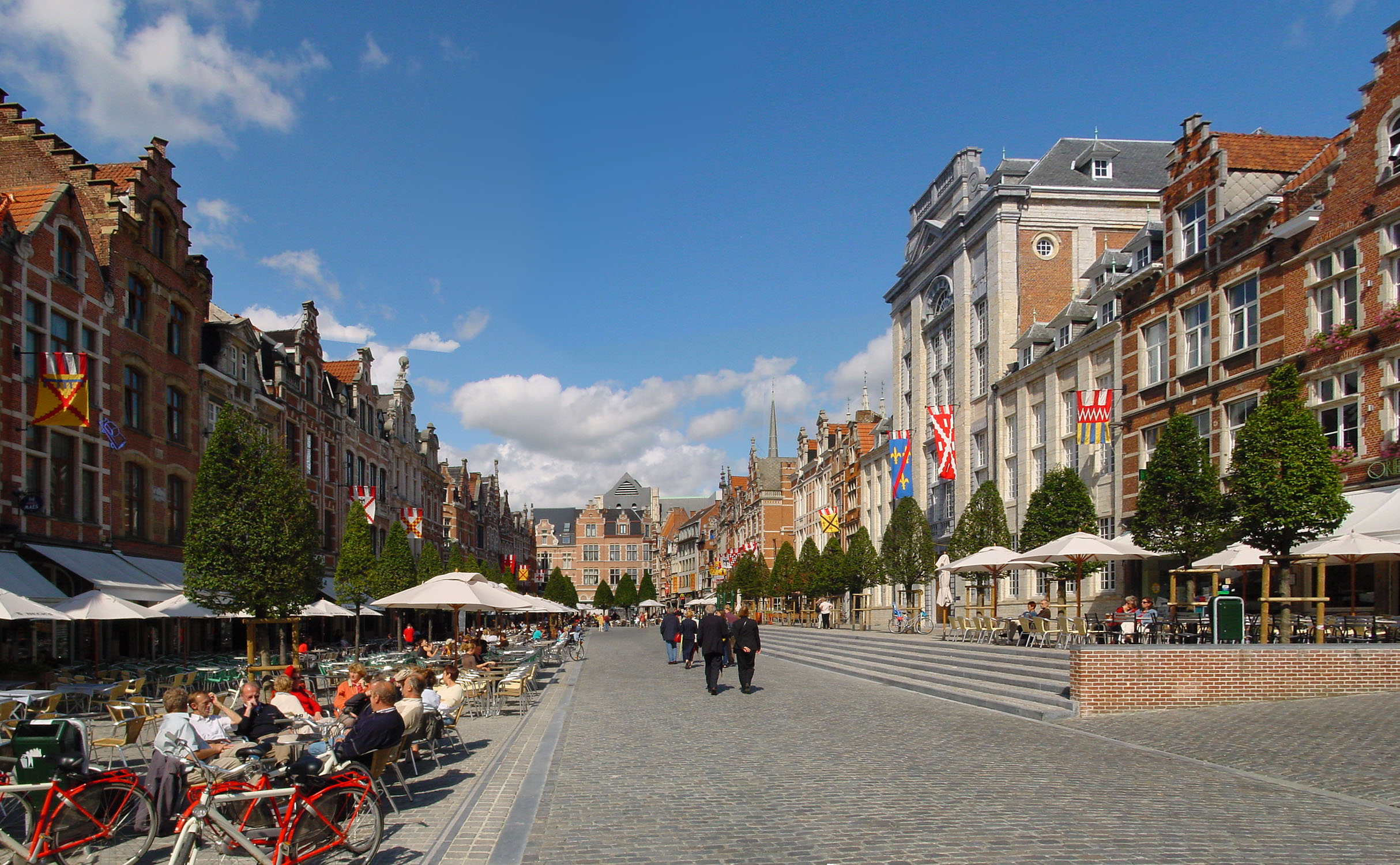
Oude Markt

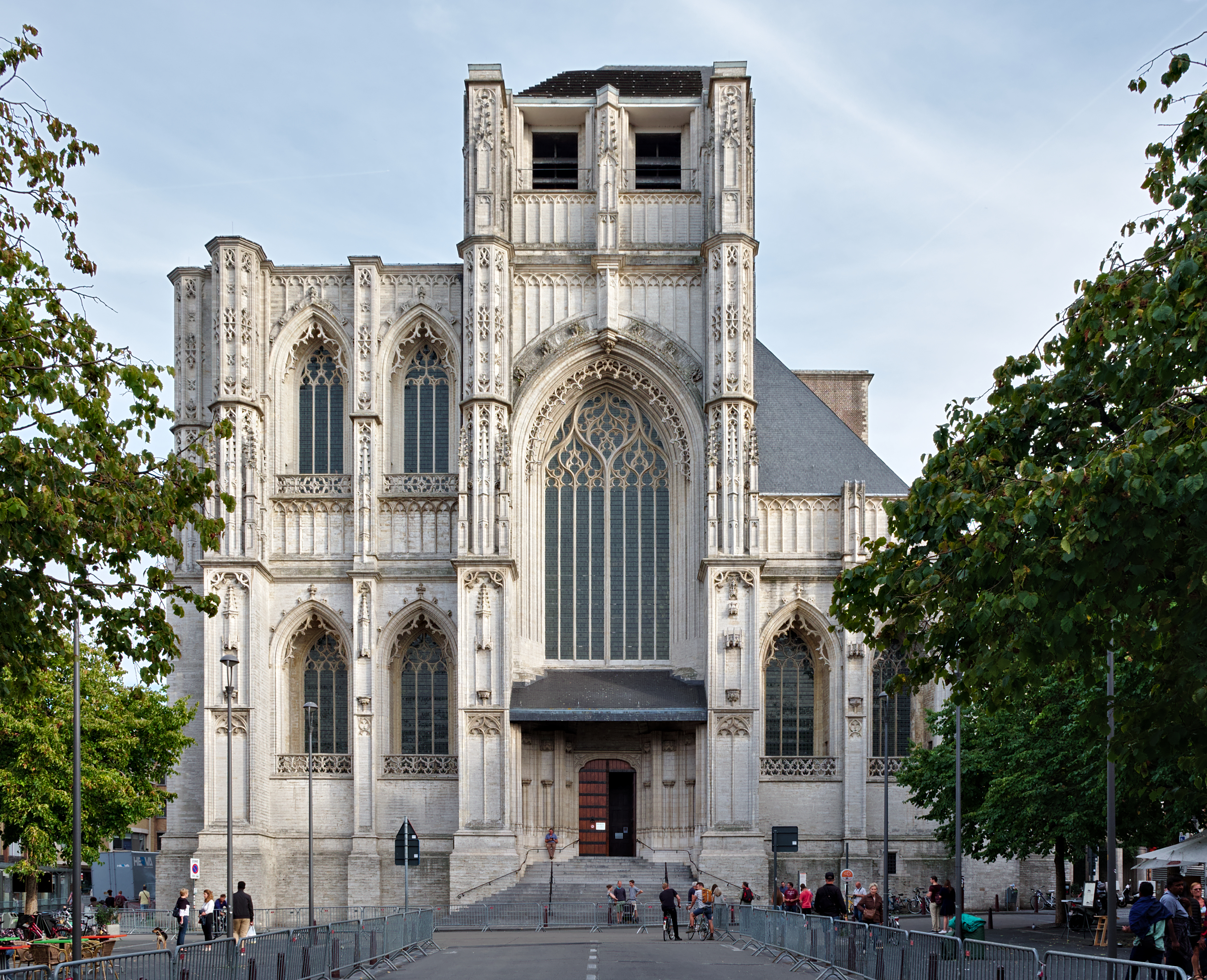
St. Peter's church

== Leuven, European Capital of Culture 2030 ==
In September 2025, the European Commission announced that Leuven, together with the East Brabant region, will be designated as the European Capital of Culture for the year 2030, representing Belgium.

== Notable people ==
=== Born in Leuven ===
- Most Dukes of Brabant in the 12th and 13th centuries
- Maria of Brabant, queen consort of France (1256–1321)
- Louis Elsevier, book publisher (1540–1617)
- Quentin Matsys, painter (1466–1530)
- Petrus Phalesius the Elder, publisher (c. 1501/05 – c. 1573/74)
- Petrus van der Aa, jurist (1530–1594)
- Valerio Profondavalle, painter (b. 1533)
- Adriaan van Roomen, mathematician (1561–1615)
- Charles de Bériot, violinist (1802–1870)
- Eugène Prévinaire, second governor of the National Bank of Belgium (1805–1877)
- Laurent-Guillaume de Koninck, palaeontologist and chemist (1809–1887)
- Jean Stas, analytical chemist (1813–1891)
- Bernardine Hamaekers, opera singer (1836–1912)
- Arthur De Greef, pianist and composer (1862–1940)
- Jean Hissette, ophthalmologist (1888–1965)
- Jef Scherens, cyclist, seven-time track cycling world champion, Men's Sprint (1909–1986)
- Georges Claes, cyclist, two-time Paris–Roubaix winner (1920–1994)
- Hortense Clews, World War II Resistance worker and Concentration Camp survivor (1926–2006)
- Arthur Berckmans, comics author (1929–2020)
- Mark Eyskens, politician and former Prime Minister of Belgium (b. 1933)
- Jan Hoet, curator and art critic (1936–2014)
- Louis Tobback, politician and mayor (b. 1938)
- Danny Fabry, musician (b. 1946)
- Marc Herman, comedian (b.1947)
- Emiel Puttemans, middle- and long-distance runner (b. 1947)
- Frank Vandenbroucke, politician (b. 1955)
- Patrick de Radiguès, racing driver and sailor (b. 1956)
- Roland Liboton, cyclist, four-time cyclo-cross world champion (b. 1957)
- Didier de Radiguès, racing driver (b. 1958)
- William Van Dijck, athlete, 1987 World Championships bronze medallist in 3000m steeplechase (b. 1961)
- Thomas Meuwissen, violinmaker (b. 1966)
- Bruno Bosteels, philosopher, known for English translations of Alain Badiou (b. 1967)
- Judith Vanistendael, comics author, illustrator (b. 1974)
- Kim Gevaert, sprint athlete, Olympic gold medalist in 4×100 relay Beijing 2008 (Silver; Gold after Russian disqualification) (b. 1978)
- Jonathan Vandenbroeck, singer-songwriter, better known as Milow (b. 1981)
- Dries Mertens, footballer (b. 1987)
- Selah Sue, musician and songwriter (b. 1989)
- Sennek, singer; represented Belgium at the 2018 Eurovision with the song "A Matter of Time" (b. 1990)
- Stienes Longin, racing driver (b. 1991)
- Jasper Stuyven, cyclist (b. 1992)
- Laurens Sweeck, cyclist (b. 1993)
- Ben Broeders, pole vault athlete (b. 1995)
- Elise Mertens, tennis (b. 1995)
- Mandela Keita, footballer (b. 2002)
- Matisse Lismont, racing driver (b. 2005)

=== Lived in Leuven ===
- Jean Baptiste Abbeloos, orientalist and rector of the University of Leuven (1836–1906)
- Adrian VI, pope and theologian (1459–1523)
- Michel Baius, theologian (1513–1589)
- Johannes Basius, agent and advisor of William of Orange (1540–1596)
- Dirk Bouts, painter (c. 1410/20–1475)
- Eustace Chapuys, Imperial ambassador to England (1489–1556)
- Christian de Duve, cytologist and biochemist, recipient of the 1974 Nobel Prize for Physiology or Medicine (b. 1917)
- Desiderius Erasmus, humanist and theologian (1466–1536)
- Matthias Vanden Gheyn, composer, organist, carillonist (1721–1785)
- Joseph Heremans, professor, Immunologist, discovered IgA and coined the term Immunoglobulins (1927–1975)
- Cornelius Jansen, father of Jansenism (1585–1638)
- Jean-Baptiste Janssens, philosophy teacher, Superior General of the Society of Jesus (1889–1964)
- Abdul Qadeer Khan, metallurgical engineer (1935-2021)
- Matheus de Layens, architect (d.1483)
- Georges Lemaître, astronomer (1894–1966), notable for proposing the Big Bang theory for the origin of the universe, dubbed by him as "hypothesis of the primeval atom" or the "Cosmic Egg".
- Ron Lewis, basketball player (b. 1984)
- Margaret of Louvain, servant, Catholic saint (1207–1225)
- Justus Lipsius, philologist and humanist (1547–1606)
- Gerardus Mercator, cartographer (1512–1594)
- Mícheál Ó Cléirigh, Irish chronicler (1590–1643)
- Daniël Theys, expressive artist and glassmaker (b. 1953)
- Jan Van der Roost, composer (b. 1956)
- Pieter-Jozef Verhaghen, painter (1728–1811)
- Philip Verheyen, surgeon and rector of the University of Leuven (1648–1711)
- Andreas Vesalius, anatomist, physician (1514–1564)

== International relations ==
=== Twin towns/sister cities ===
Leuven is twinned with:

- 's-Hertogenbosch, Netherlands
- Kraków, Poland
- Lüdenscheid, Germany
- Rennes, France
- Ottignies-Louvain-la-Neuve, Belgium

=== Friendly relations ===
Aside from the aforementioned cities, Leuven has friendly relations with:

- New Delhi, India
- Tainan, Taiwan
- Stellenbosch, South Africa
- Wuxi, People's Republic of China
- Ocaña, Spain "Ocaña".

Leuven has an 'adoptive village'

- Cristian, Romania

== See also ==
- Koninklijke Oost- en Westvlaamsche Kring
