= Sint-Donatus Park =

Park in Leuven, Belgium

Coordinates: 50°52′31.97″N 4°42′10.46″E

The Sint-Donatus Park is an urban park with a village green in Leuven, Belgium.

The park is located between the Charles Deberiotstraat, the Vlamingenstraat and the Tiensestraat. The park was laid out in an English landscaping style and was redeveloped between 1993 and 1998.

In the Sint-Donatuspark, there are several remains of the original inner city walls from the twelfth century. Among which are a few towers.

== Gallery ==
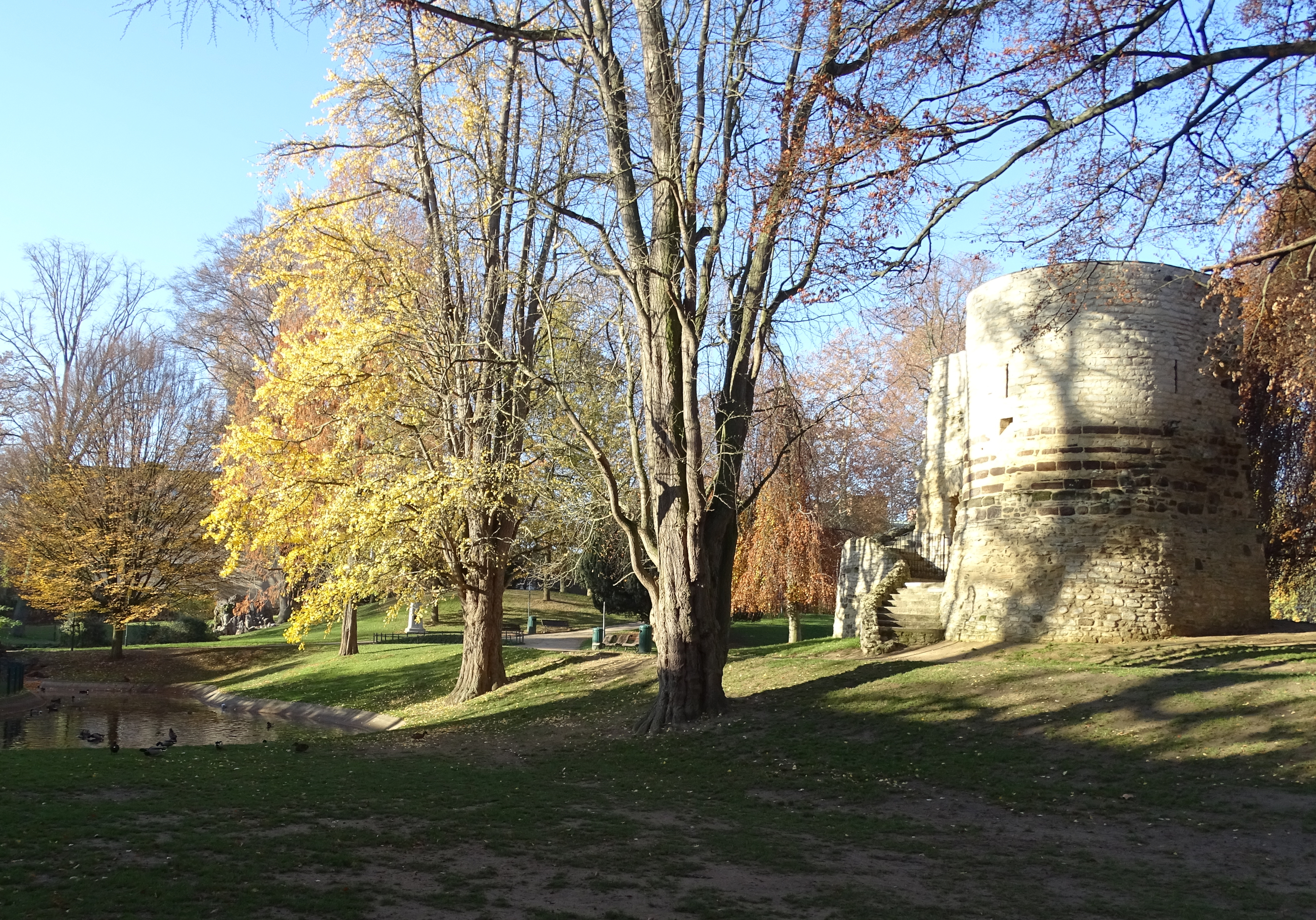

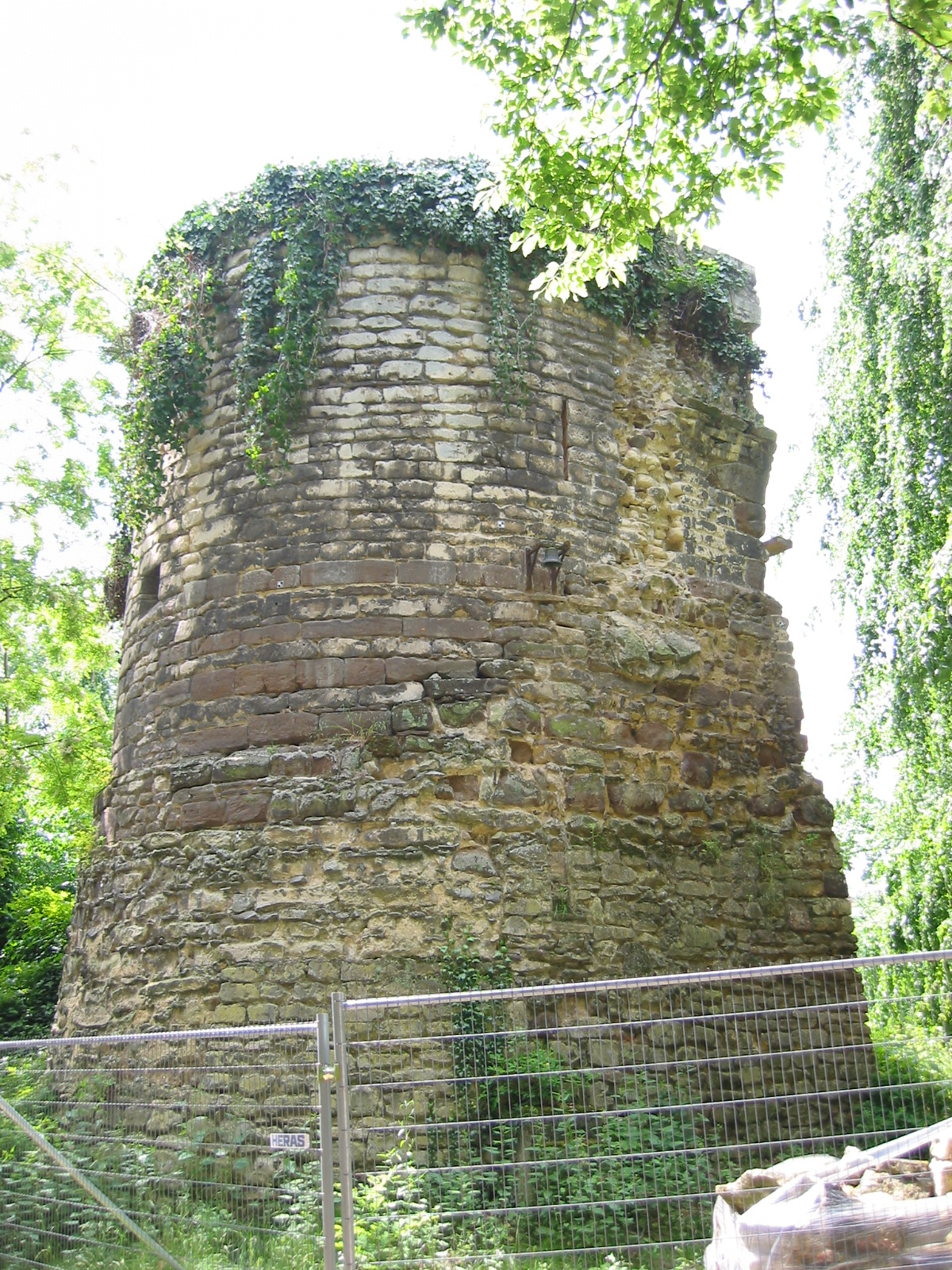

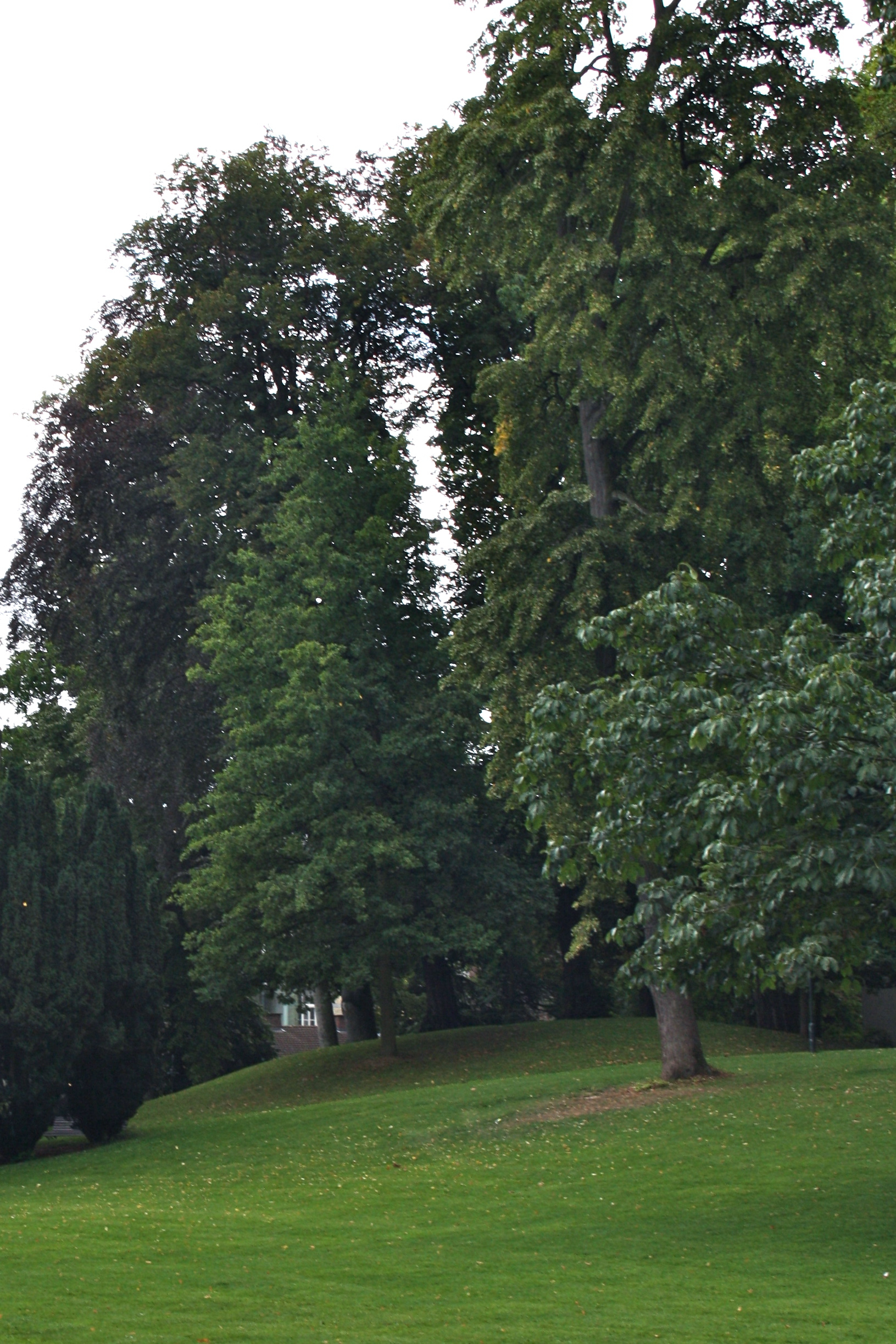

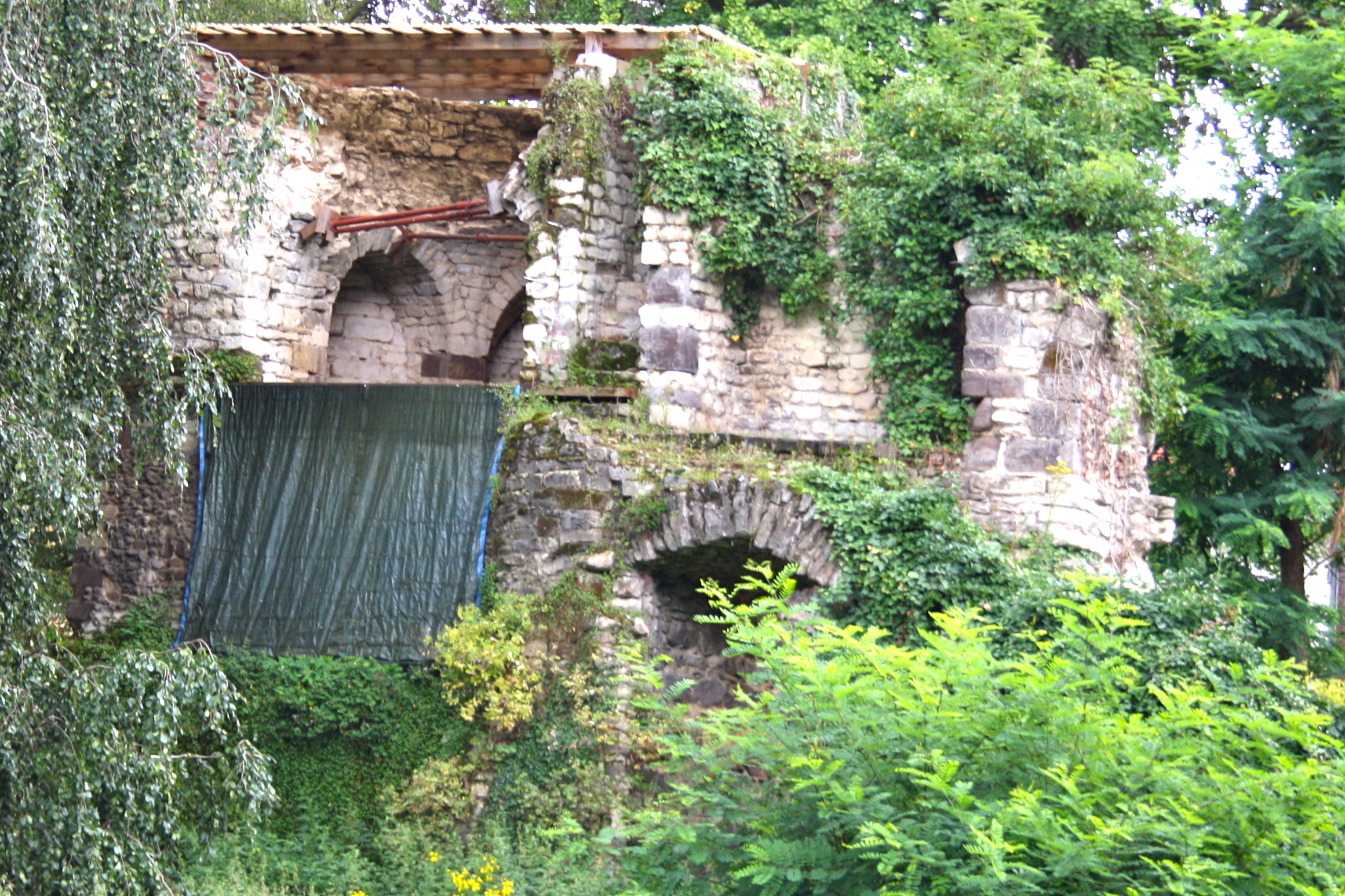

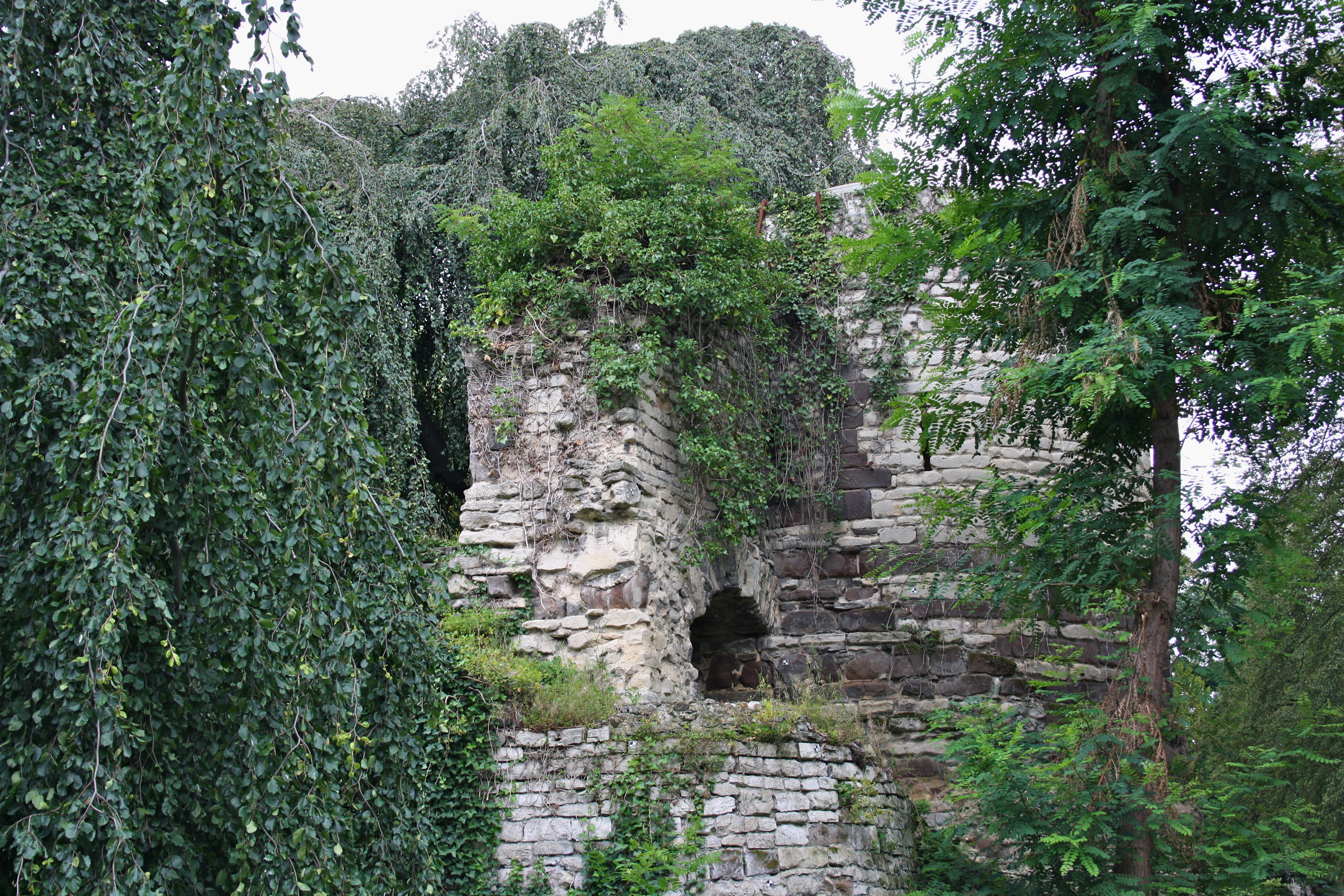

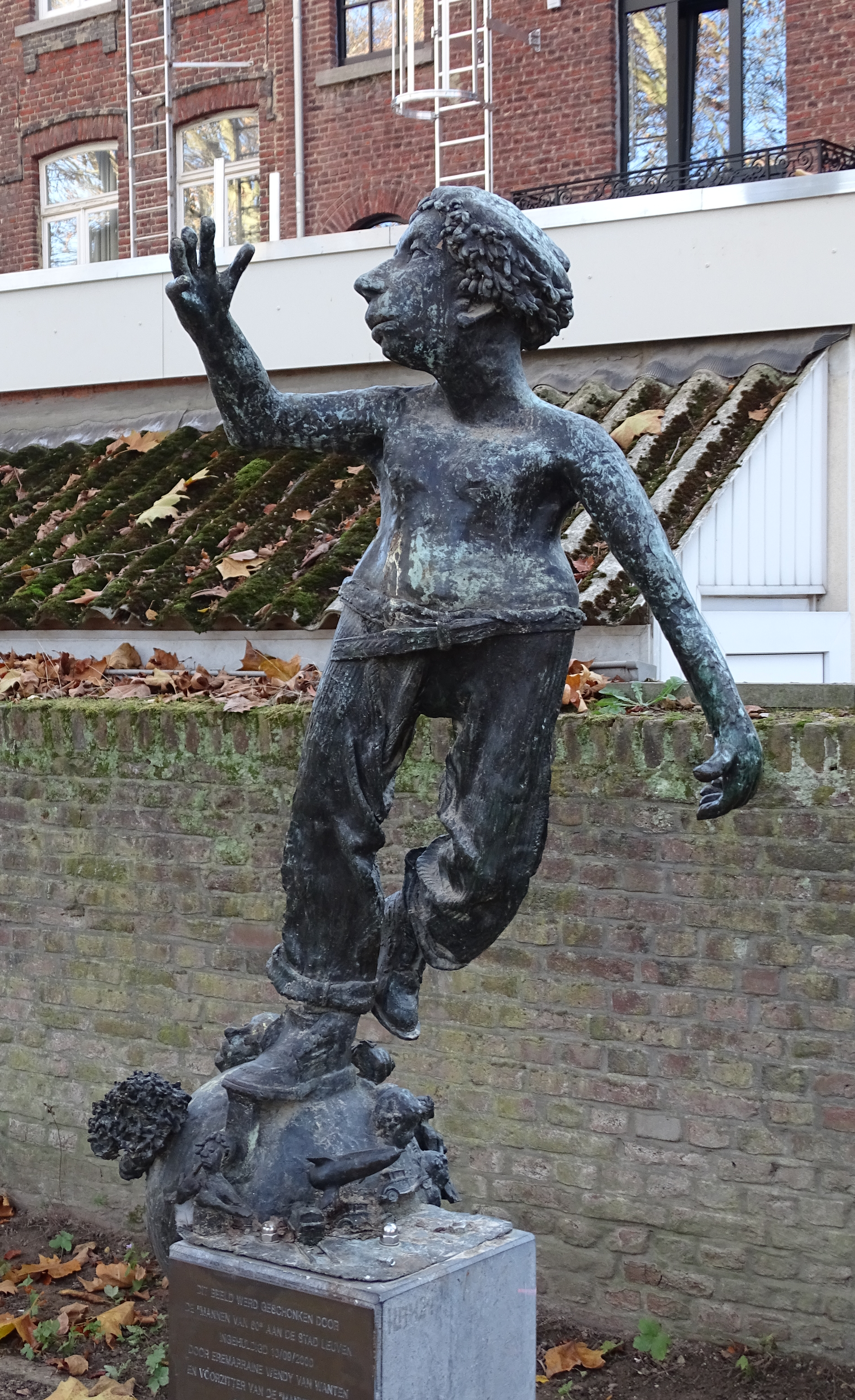
