= Marc Herman =

Belgian comedian

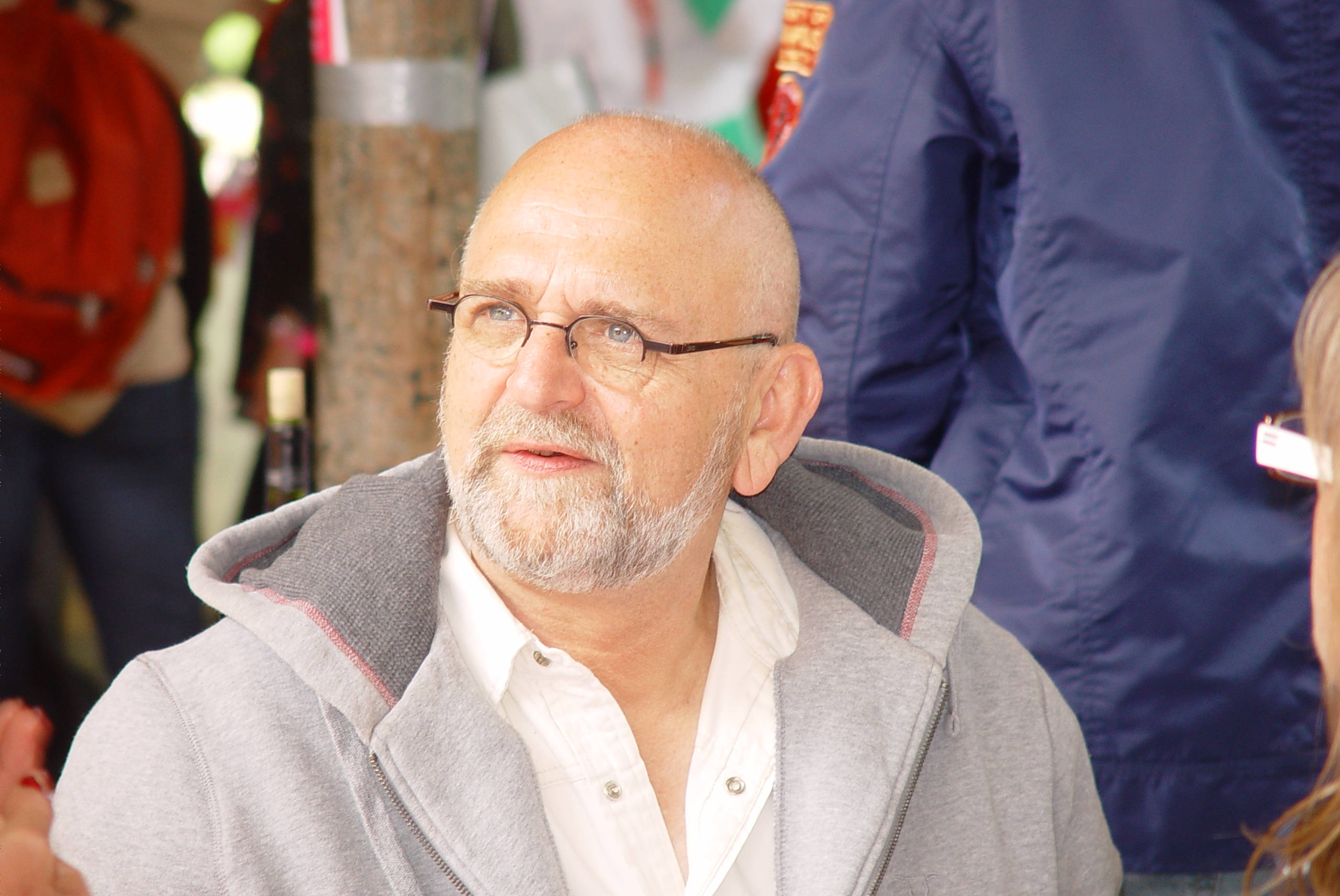
- Born: Marc Maloens; Leuven, Belgium

Marc Herman, whose real name is Marc Maloens, is a Belgian humorist born in Leuven in 1947.

== The Stuuûts ==
=== The main characters ===
- Luc Dierrieckx / Marc Herman: In the first Stuuût he called himself Luc Dierrieckx (the same character he played the TV Tor traps before going to the RTBF for his first Stuuût). In the others he calls himself in the two ways.
- Madeleine (Wolleke): Marc's wife.
- Raoul: His brother-in-law, stupid but kind and always ready to help. He has a very important place in the shows.
- Roseline: Raoul's wife and Wolleke's half-sister, she is sour, stingy, insincere and violent.
- Roseline's mother (no name): She is worse than Roseline. Raoul and Roseline lived with her at the beginning of their marriage.
- Rahoul: Raoul's brother. The "H" was added when the parents had to declare his birth in the office of Mayor to not mix up with his elder brother. Orally he is called "Rachoul". He is the exact copy of Raoul.
- Irène: Rahoul's wife, very kind but as stupid as the two brothers. It is never explained why everybody calls her Loulou.
- Blacky: Marc and Wolleke's white dog.
- Bomama: Wolleke's grandmother, she is energetic and has sense of humor.
- Alfred (Father-in-law): Bomama's husband who died a long time ago.
- Georges: One of Marc's uncles who has sense of humour.
- Boss of TV Tor (no name): A fictive local TV channel in Flanders where Luc Dierrieckx is the only employee.
- Tarasba: The cat, called Tarasboulba in the past but his name was changed to Tarasba after his castration.
- Corniche: Marc's second cat.
- Willy Hams: One of Marc's neighbors. An alcoholic called Williams because of the Poire Williams which he is addicted to. He became more alcoholic because of a friend's death.
- Sacha: An unlucky character in Stuuût 1.

== Shows ==
Since 1981, he has written and performed 24 shows and 2 stage plays, 10 of which have been broadcast on RTBF and 11 on RTL-TVI. He first appeared on French channels in the programme La Classe and participated in the RTL programme Il y en aura pour tout le monde in which he organized fake interviews. In 1996, he left RTL to go to RTBF where he would take part to the programme Bon Week End, and where he presented his first Stuuût on the same set of the programme. The other shows follow each other with varying frequency, the Stuuût 2 in 1999, the Stuuût 3 in 2002, the Stuuût 4 in 2004 and the Stuuût 5 in 2009 (between Stuuût 4 and 5 he created two stage plays). In 2010 he returned to RTL-TVI and released the Stuuût 6 in October. In three years he produced ten new Stuuûts and three bests of. He left the systematic numbering of the "Stuuût" shows aside for some themes with Raoul and the rest of his family (a rally in the "Stutuuût", the camping in "Raoul go au Camping") or simply diversifying the show title ("Raoulade et Riettes").

=== One Man Shows ===
1. La Comiquaudiovisuelitérapie (1981)
2. Pain Perdu (1989)
3. Tout terrain (1991)
4. Un Carton (1995)
5. Flash Back (2001) broadcast by RTBF (2001)

=== Stuuût ===
1. Le Stuuût (1997) broadcast by RTBF (1998)
2. Le Stuuût 2 (1999) broadcast by RTBF (2000)
3. Le Stuuût Roi (2002) broadcast by RTBF (2003)
4. Le Meilleur des stuuût (2004) broadcast by RTBF (2005)
5. Le Stuuût K4T (2005) broadcast by RTBF (2006)
6. Le Bestuuût 2008 broadcast by RTBF (2008)
7. Le Stuuût 5 (2008) broadcast by RTBF (2009)
8. Le Sixième sens (2010) (Stuuût 6) broadcast by RTL-TVI (03/10/2010)
9. 30 ans (2010) broadcast by RTL-TVI (28/12/2010)
10. Le Stuuût 007 (2011) broadcast by RTL-TVI(25/04/2011)
11. J'ai 8 dire (2011) (Stuuût 8) broadcast by RTL-TVI (19/06/2011)
12. Raoulades et Ri-ettes (2011) broadcast by RTL-TVI (30/10/2011)
13. Le Bestuuût 2011 (2011) broadcast by RTL-TVI (24/12/2011)
14. Un 9 à peler (2012) (Stuuût 9) broadcast by RTL-TVI(25/03/2012)
15. Le Stuuût X (2012) (Stuuût 10) broadcast by RTL-TVI (03/06/2012)
16. 11 saura tout (2012) (Stuuût 11) broadcast by RTL-TVI (18/11/2012)
17. Les 12 coups (2012) (Stuuût 12) broadcast by RTL-TVI (26/12/2012)
18. Le Top des Stuuût (2013) broadcast by RTL-TVI (10/03/2013)
19. Le Stut-uût (2013) broadcast by RTL-TVI (16/06/2013)
20. Pas de st'13 en 2013 (2013) not broadcast
21. Raoul au camping (2013) broadcast by RTL-TVI (14/12/2013)
22. Raoul fait la fête (2013) broadcast by RTL-TVI (31/12/2013)
23. Raoul se soigne (2014) broadcast by RTL-TVI (20/04/2014)
24. Raoul est dans le pré (2014) broadcast by RTL-TVI (05/10/2014)
25. Sketchup & Mayo (2014) broadcast by RTL-TVI (21/12/2014)
26. Le Monde est Stuuût (2015) broadcast by RTL-TVI (12/04/2015)

=== Theatre ===
1. L’Alarme Fatale (2005) broadcast by RTBF (2005)
2. On s’organise (2007) broadcast by RTBF (2007)

== Filmography ==
- Pom le Poulain (2007)
- Les oiseaux de Passage (2015)

== Awards ==
- 2002: Chevalier de l’Ordre de la Couronne
- 2006: Citoyen d’honneur of Rochefort
- 2009: Médaille d’or au salon des inventeurs for the game "SPIKIT"
