= Valerio Profondavalle =

Italian painter

Valerio Profondavalle or Valerio Diependale (1533 – c. 1600) was a Flemish historical painter of the Renaissance period, born in Leuven, Belgium but active in Italy. Profondavalle created an amount of work in Ducal Palace, Milan, and was partly known for his expertise with stained glass.

Valerio Profondavalle lived for some time at Florence, and afterwards settled in Milan. His daughter, Prudenzia, painted still-life and historical subjects. Their real name was Diependale, and they belonged to a famous glass-painting family in Leuven of the 15th and 16th centuries.
