= Johannes Basius =

Dutch lawyer

Johannes Basius (c. 1540, Leeuwarden – 11 September 1596, Delft) was born in Friesland, and studied at Leuven and afterwards in France, where he was made a doctor of law. He then became an advocate in his native country and an agent and adviser of Prince William of Orange. He wrote Paradoxorum Disputationem Juris Civilis. Basius died while he was secretary of the senate at Delft, in Holland.
