= Thomas Meuwissen =

Belgian violinmaker (born 1966)

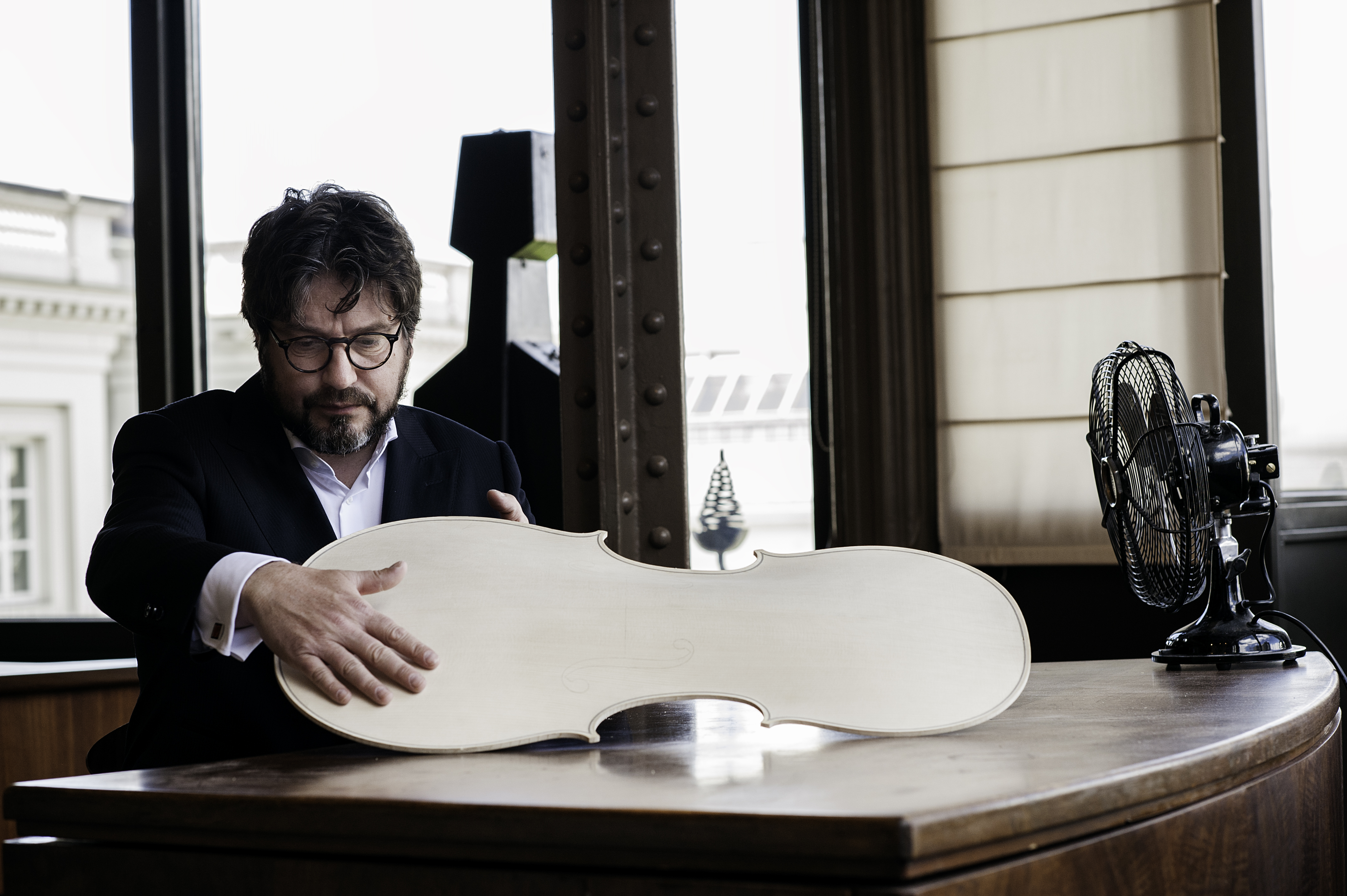
Portrait of Thomas Meuwissen by Charlie Dekeersmaecker

Thomas Meuwissen (born 25 March 1966, in Leuven) is a Belgian violinmaker. Since 1987, he has been working exclusively on the production of modern and baroque violins, violas, and cellos. His work includes antiqued copies of instruments by old Italian masters (such as Antonio Stradivari, Guarneri del Gesù, Matteo Goffriller, and others).

== Biography ==
Thomas Meuwissen was trained at the British Newark School of Violin Making, later developing his skills in the workshops of Premysl Špidlen in Praag, and Fréderic Chaudière in Montpellier. He now lives and works in Brussels, and has been the ‘violin-maker in residence’ at the Royal Conservatory since 1993. His work is held in private and public collections at Royal Conservatory of Brussels in Belgium, The Beckett Collection in the UK, Muziekinstrumentenfonds in the Netherlands, and Dextra Musica in Norway.

== Rewards ==
Thomas Meuwissen was awarded at various international violin making competitions:

- Concours de lutherie et d’archèterie de Paris (Brons, 1999)
- Concorso Antonio Stradivarius, Cremona (Distinction, 2002)
- British Violin Making Association Competition, Londen (Honorary mention, 2004)
- Violin Society of America Competition (Certificate of Merit for workmanship, 2004)
- Internationaler Geigenbauwettbewerb Mittenwald (Zilver, 2005)
- Strad Cello and Bow Making Competition, Manchester (Zilver, 2007)
- Violin Society of America Competition (Certificate of Merit for sound, 2008)
