= Josef Speckbacher =

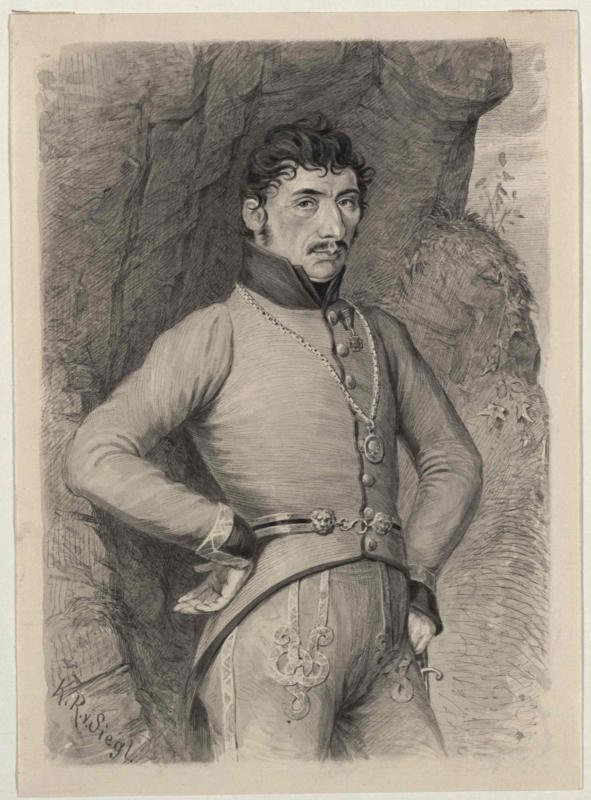
Josef Speckbacher

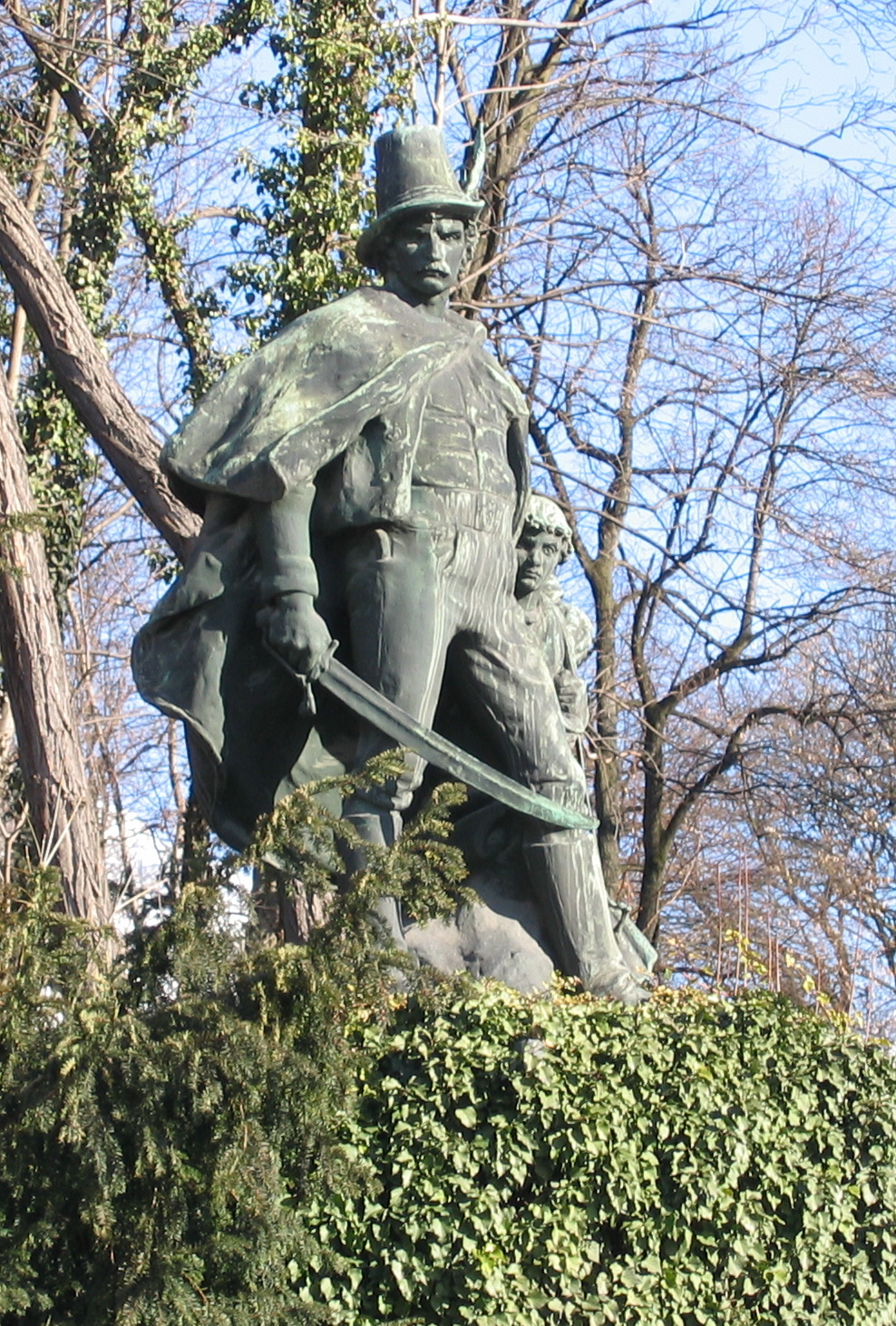
Josef-Speckbacher-Denkmal (Hall in Tirol)

Josef Speckbacher (13 July 1767, Gnadenwald – 28 March 1820, Hall in Tirol) was a leading figure in the rebellion of the Tyrol against Napoleon.

== His life ==
Josef Speckbacher was born on July 13, 1767, in Gnadenwald, near Hall, in Austria's Tyrolean Alps. He was a peasant’s son, for Speckbacher’s father supplied wood for the salt mines of Hall for a living. Receiving only a brief education, Josef roamed the woods, poaching by the age of twelve, which got him into trouble with the forest officials. Josef got a job working in the Imperial salt mine in Hall. This work allowed him to start a family of his own.

On February 10, 1794, 27-year-old Speckbacher married Mary Schmiederer, and relocated to her farm in Judenstein, Rinn. From that time on, he had the nickname “the Man from Rinn.” He was respected by his community, and in 1796, during a politically sensitive time, he was elected to the local court committee.

France and Austria were at war, though, so he enlisted as a volunteer militiaman. On April 2, 1797, at the Battle of Spinges (in the town Spinges, near Brixen), Speckbacher fought in the ranks of Captain Philip von Wörndle beside Catherine Lanz, the heroine of Spinges, earning a reputation as a zealous sharpshooter. He continued the defense against Napoleon’s Marshal Ney until 1805, when the French were victorious. The Austrian Tyrol was obliged to accept being ceded to Napoleon’s ally, Bavaria.

By 1809, the Austrian government sought to recapture the Tyrol through guerrilla tactics. Speckbacher showed himself to be not only a daring fighter, but also a cautious but fearless strategist. According to his diary, he took part in thirty-six battles and skirmishes in 1809 alone. Early in the morning of April 12, 1809, he surprised the city of Hall, imprisoned the garrison troops and prevented the French retreat into the safety of the valley of the lower Inn. On May 31 he commanded the left wing during the Battle of Mount Isel, and achieved victory near Hall and Volders. From June 23 to July 16, he laid siege to Kufstein Castle. Here he gave countless proofs of his personal courage, built artillery emplacements, destroyed mills and boats useful to the enemy, burnt the city, captured the train of provisions, and even made his way as a spy into the castle. From August 4 to the 11th he was most of the time the commander in the battles between Sterzing and Franzensfeste against Marshal Lefebvre. He forced the marshal to quit the battlefield and with Hofer and Haspinger commanded troops at the famous Third Battle of Mount Isel (August 13 and 15, 1809).

After the enemy had been driven from the Mount Isel area, he and his men forced their way into the mountains of Salzburg, organizing and stimulating the defense of the countryside. On September 25 he defeated the combined forces of the French and Bavarians at Lofer who, with great loss, fell back on Reichenhall. On October 16 Speckbacher was surprised at Melleck by a superior force of the enemy and was obliged to retreat. His young son Andreas was taken prisoner in that battle, and he himself was severely wounded. On October 17, at Waidring and again at Volders on October 23, he was able to hold the field against the foe, evading capture once more in a skirmish on October 28, and later captured a battalion of the enemy. On November 1, 1809, after the last and unsuccessful fight on Mount Isel, he was obliged to abandon the unequal contest, even though he wished to continue the struggle.

The French and Bavarians hunted for him specifically, and a reward of five hundred florin was offered to anyone who would deliver him alive or dead to the authorities. Speckbacher spent the entire winter in the Tyrolean Alps, hiding among friends at lonely farms, or in Alpine huts, always hunted by enemies. He was betrayed just once, but saved himself by a daring flight and hid himself until January, 1810, in the clefts of the rocks, often near death from hunger. His wife and four children also sought safety by flight, hiding in the mountains. Speckbacher's last hiding place was near the top of a high Alp in the Voldertal, where the only one who brought him food was his faithful servant George Zoppel. On March 14 an avalanche overwhelmed him, injuring him severely. He was brought by friends to his farm at Judenstein, where Zoppel hid him in the stable under the floor until 2 May. He did continue the resistance. It was unsafe to stay, so he was forced to flee amid great dangers through the Pinzgau and Styria to the capitol of Vienna, where he was warmly received by the Emperor Francis I. For his service, the emperor presented Speckbacher with a chain of honor and a pension. There he stayed in the emperor’s service until 1814, living with his friend Jacob Troggler.

In the autumn of 1813 Speckbacher returned to the Tyrol as a major of the Tyrolese volunteers in the imperial army under General Fenner. He garrisoned with these troops of Southern Tyrol against the French, kepping watch against the enemy.

On September 12, 1813, the Bavarian government at Innsbruck once more set a price of 1000 florins on his head, and it was not until the summer of 1814 that Speckbacher was able to return home to Rinn unmolested. In 1815 he received a second gold chain of honor, and in 1816 he publicly received the personal notice of the emperor. He joyfully reunited his son, who was held prisoner but had been well educated during his confinement in Munich, and looked forward to a peaceful old age, but the hardships he had undergone affected his ability to work a farm. He was forced to sell his farm and move to Hall.

In 1820 Speckbacher was diagnosed with a kidney disease, the onset of which was from his time in the war. Speckbacher died in Hall on March 28, 1820, at the age of 53 after several weeks of violent pain. On March 30 Hall received as guests several rifle companies to honor his funeral. On April 20, 1858, his remains were exhumed and ceremonially buried in the Court Church of Innsbruck next to Andreas Hofer and Joachim Haspinger. There, the tomb can still be admired today.

== Legacy ==
In honor of Josef Speckbacher streets were named after him in Wilten, Innsbruck and Vienna, as well as in Ottakring in Kufstein, Wörgl, St. Johann in Tirol, and Merano. A barracks in Hall in the Tyrol also bore his name, but the Speckbacher barracks was abandoned and sold in 1998. His character is well expressed in his epitaph: "In war wild but also human, in peace quiet and faithful to the laws he was as soldier, subject, and man worthy of honor and love".

== Sources ==
- Köfler, Wilhelm and Wolfgang Pfaundler. Der Tiroler Freiheitskampf 1809 unter Andreas Hofer – Zeitgenössische Augenzeugenberichte und Dokumente (München: Süddt. Verl., 1986) ISBN 3-7991-6214-3
- New Advent Encyclopedia, “Josef Speckbacher”, 2009. https://www.newadvent.org/cathen/14210b.htm
- Trenker, Luis. Der Feuerteufel. Ein Speckbacher-Roman. (Berlin: Franz Eher, 1940)
- von Worndle, Heinrich. Original Catholic Encyclopedia. “Josef Speckbacher”, 2013. https://web.archive.org/web/20150929045231/http://oce.catholic.com/index.php?title=Josef_Speckbacher
- Weber, Fritz. Der Mann von Rinn. Ein Speckbacher-Roman. (Graz, 1949)
- Karl Theodor von Heigel (1893). "Speckbacher, Josef" . Allgemeine Deutsche Biographie (in German). Vol. 35. Leipzig: Duncker & Humblot. pp. 78–81.
- R. Schober: "Speckbacher Josef". In: Österreichisches Biographisches Lexikon 1815–1950 (ÖBL). Vol. 13, Austrian Academy of Sciences, Vienna 2010, ISBN 978-3-7001-6963-5, p. 12.
