= Judenstein =

District of Rinn, Austria

Coordinates: 47.2603°N 11.5056°E

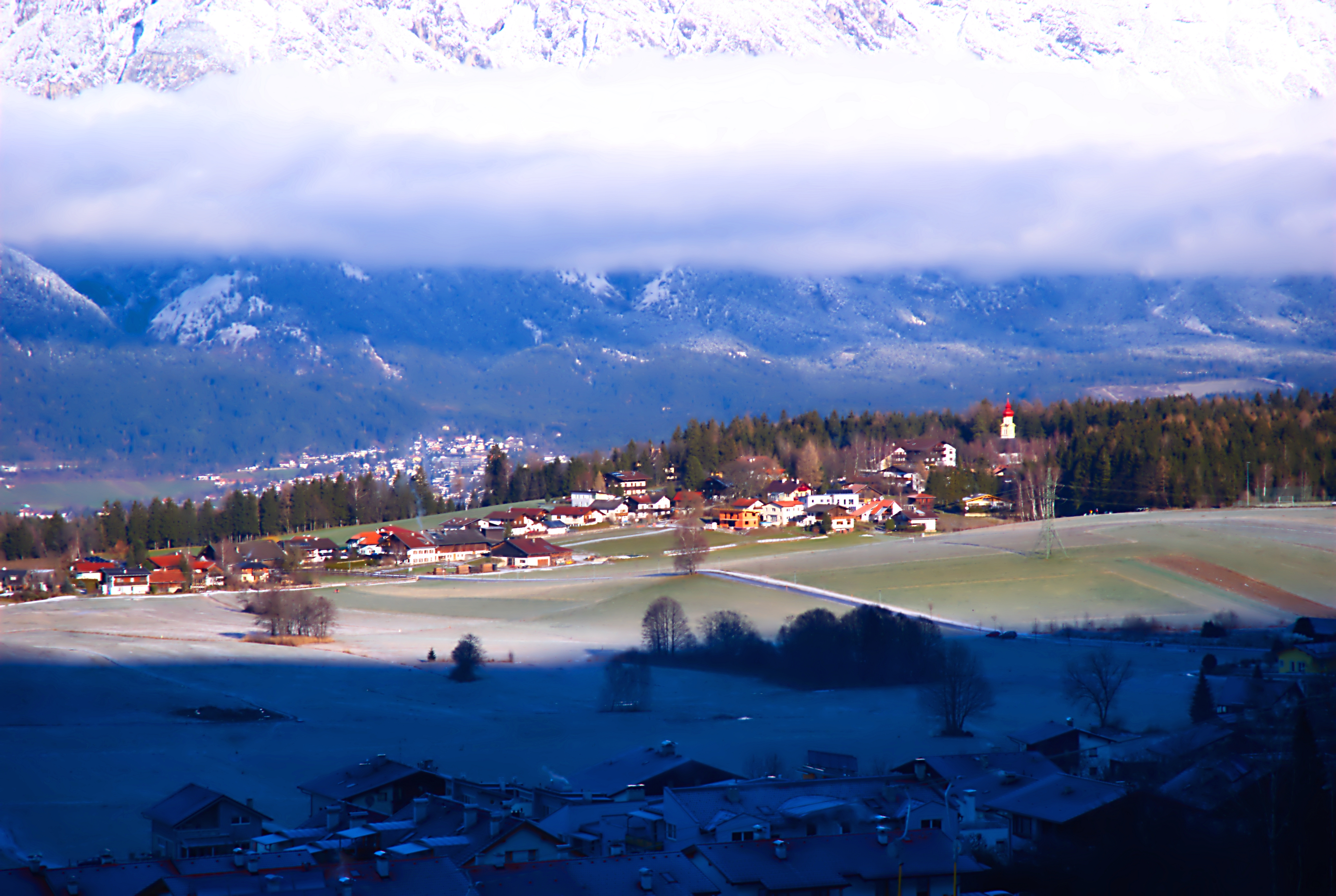
Remote view of Judenstein

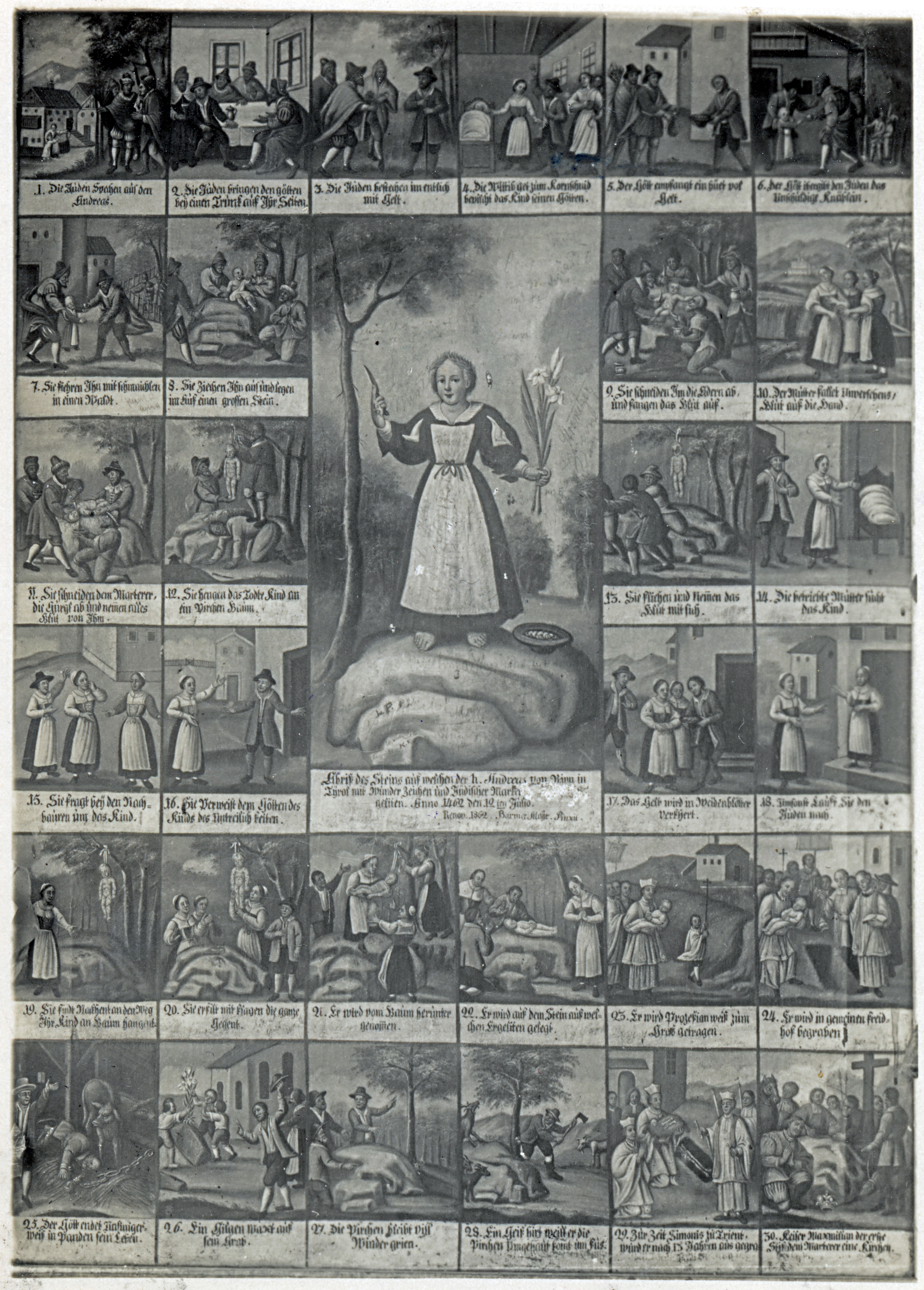
Judenstein on postcard depicting a painting from early 19th century

Judenstein ("Jew stone") is a district of the village of Rinn, Austria, in the state of Tyrol. In 1671, the blood libel cult of Anderl von Rinn emerged, and a church was built around a rock where a child (Anderl, "Little Andrew") had been alleged to have been killed by Jews in a ritual murder, hence the place name.

There is a large stone within the nave of the church which was probably brought in from elsewhere, since there are no other large freestanding stones in the immediate neighbourhood, although there were at the time when the church was built. The church is lavishly decorated with paintings and mouldings in Rococo style that are said to have been made in the 1730s. The same style of elaborate decoration can be seen in a number of churches in the area, for example in nearby Rinn, which is even more ornate, and notably in Innsbruck.

== Nearby municipalities ==
Judenstein is close to the municipalities of Gasteig, Mooshöfe, Rinn, Mount Rinn, Tulfes, Aldrans, Ampass, Ellbögen, Rans, Sistrans, Lans, Absam, Hall, Mils, Rum, and Innsbruck.
