= Hippolytus Guarinonius =

Tridentine physician and polymath

Hippolytus Guarinonius Hippolyt Guarinoni / Ippolito Guarinoni
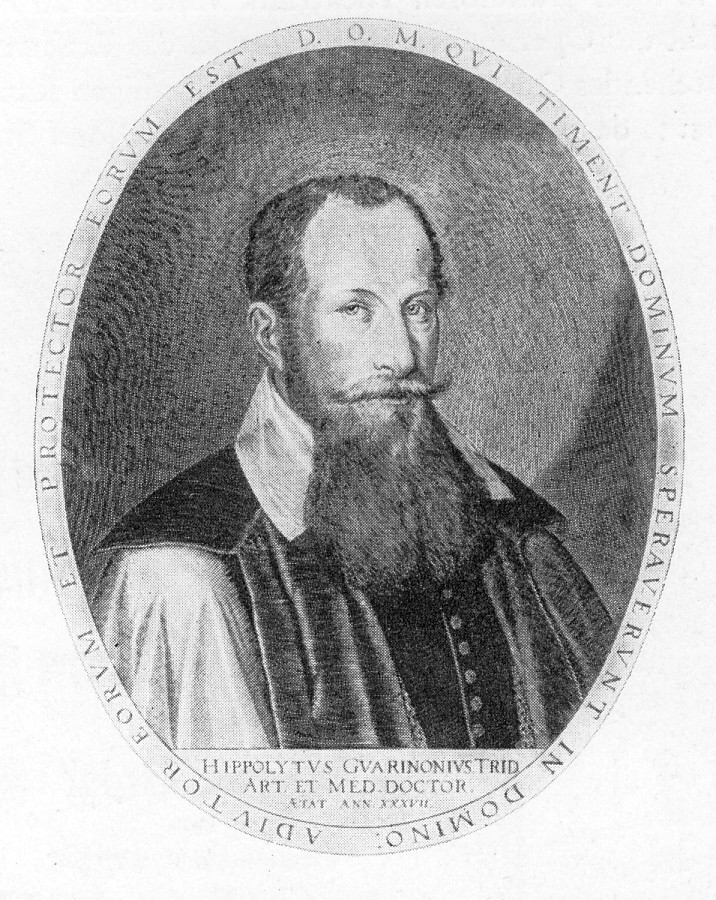
- Born: 18 November 1571; Trent (Holy Roman Empire)
- Died: 31 May 1654 (aged 82); Hall in Tirol (Holy Roman Empire)
- Occupations: Physician, counter reformation activist
- Spouse(s): Charitas Thaler (1599); Helena von Spieß (1613)
- Children: 10

Hippolytus Guarinonius (18 November 1571 – 31 May 1654) was a Tyrolean physician from Trento and polymath who spent most of his life in Hall in Tirol. He represented a militant strand of Catholicism and was instrumental in the building of the St Charles Church (Karlskirche) in Volders. He was also an instigator of the antisemitic cult of Andreas Oxner.

== Life ==
Guarinonius was born in Trent, which was then a powerful bishopric. His father, Bartolomeo Guearinius, the son of a physician and the grandson of a goldsmith, was called away to Vienna soon after the boy's birth, to take up a post as a physician at the court of Emperor Maximillian II. The mother of Guaronius, Catharina Pellegrini, came from an established Trent family, but due to family opposition his parents, though married, were not married to each other, which made Hippolytus Guarinonius illegitimate. Issues regarding his birth status would be retrospectively resolved in 1618, however, when Pope Paul V declared that his parents had been married to each other. Despite reports to the contrary, Hippolytus Guarinonius himself later recorded that he spent the first eleven years of his life growing up in Vienna till his father relocated to Prague in 1583, still a court physician, but now working for a new emperor, Rudolf II.

In Prague, Guarinonius received an intensive and formative education as one of approximately 150 boarders at the Jesuit Gymnasium (secondary school). Between 1593 and 1597 he studied Medicine at the University of Padua, where he qualified as a doctor in 1598. After his studies, he may have worked as a doctor in Trent. By 1601, he had relocated to Hall in Tirol, then an important administrative city in the Habsburg territories, some 180 km (110 miles) to the north of Trent. One of his early appointments at Hall in Tirol came in 1601 when he was appointed municipal physician, which was a public appointment. In 1607 he was appointed personal physician to Archduchesses Eleanor and Maria Christina of Austria, Habsburg siblings who had retreated to a monastic life in the town following the collapse of Maria Christina's marriage to Sigismund Báthory.

In 1611–12, Hall in Tirol was hit by plague (probably bacterial typhus) and Guarinonius moved out of the town centre. He encouraged the construction of medical huts where plague victims could be accommodated in more sanitary conditions, paying particular attention to preventive measures, attending to the operation of the mineral springs and encouraging physical health and exercise. He also coined the phrase, "Achtung auf die Natur und zurück zu ihr, Maßhalten in jedem!"

One of Guarinonius' passions was the strengthening of Catholicism through the Counter-Reformation. This won him plaudits in conservative circles but also made him a controversial figure for the town council and for other fellow citizens, some of whom founds Guarinonius an unscrupulous tactician. Sometimes, his fanaticism was too much even for his Jesuit mentors. In 1611, his behaviour was denounced to the Archduke by Bolzano theosophist Adam Haslmayr. Haslmayr's intemperate outburst earned him a punishing stretch as a Genoa galley slave, although he survived the experience.

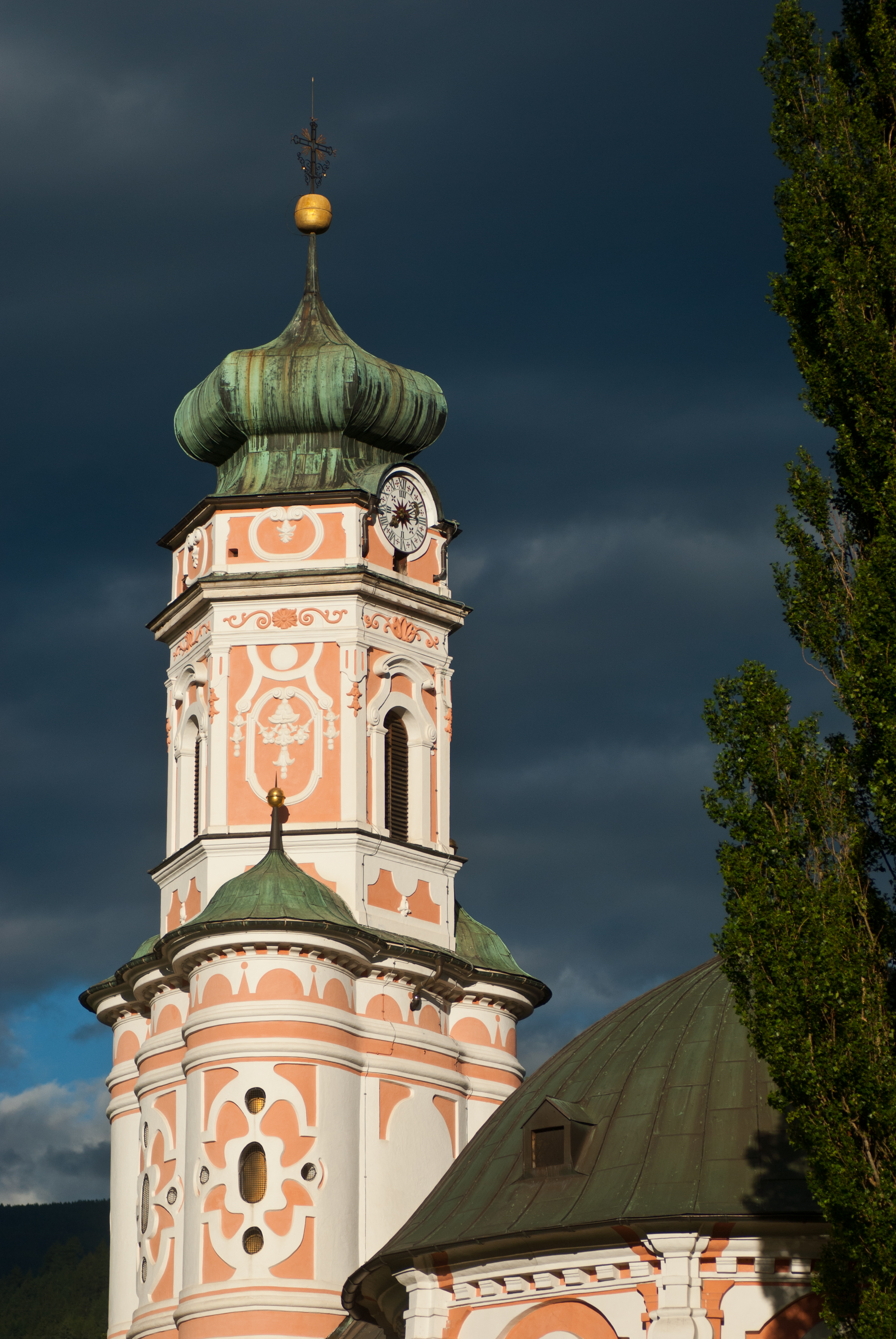
Guarinonius directed the construction of the Karlskirche in Volders, which was built according to his own design. (photograph Hermann Hammer)

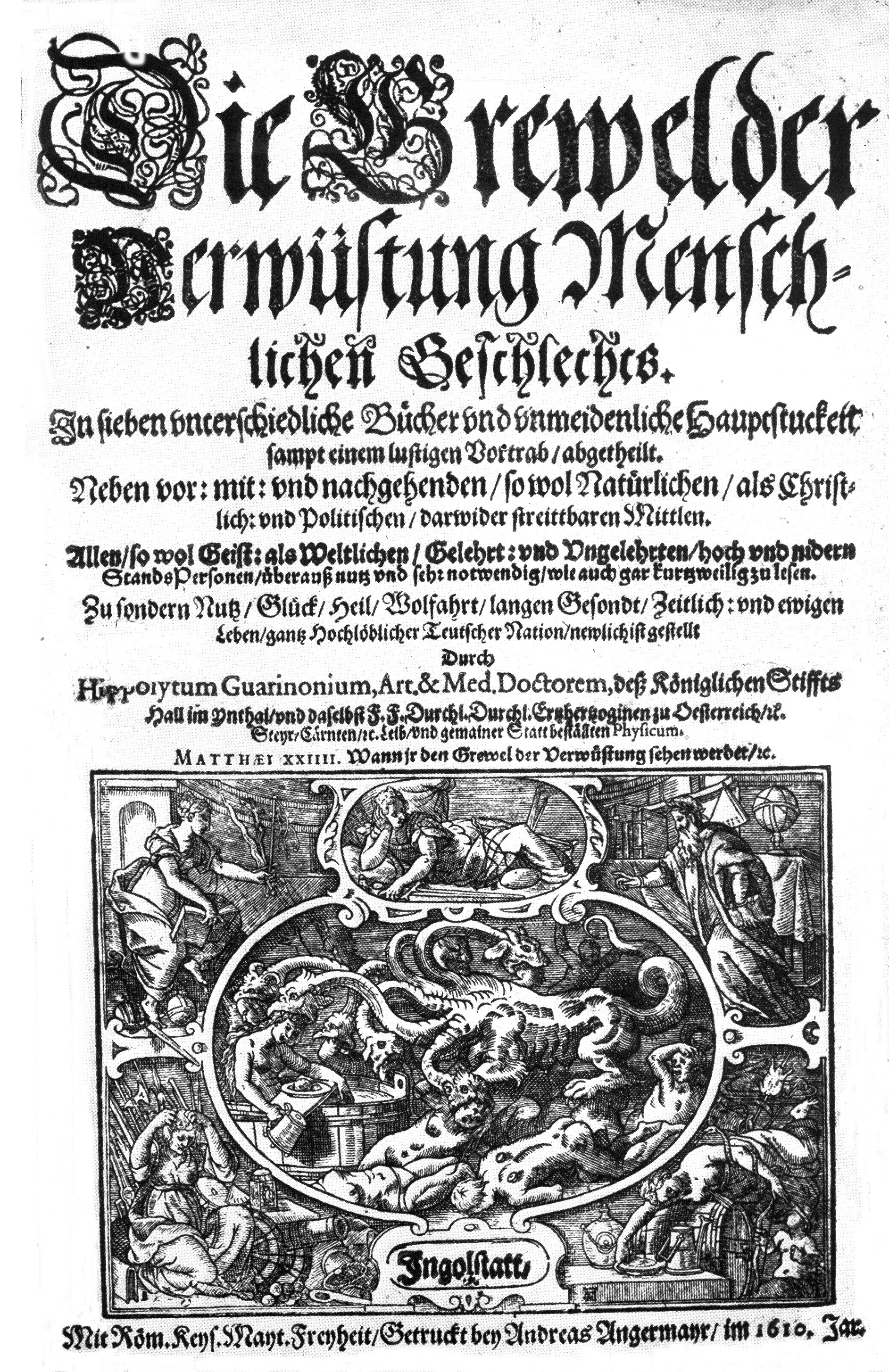
"Die Grewel der Verwüstung menschlichen Geschlechts" title page (Ingolstadt, 1610)

From 1620 until his death, Guarinonius directed the construction of the St Charles Church (Karlskirche) in Volders, which was built according to his own design. He was also responsible for the construction of several other religious buildings. At the same time, Guarinonius continued to publish medical and religious texts during this period.

In 1628 he was authorized by Daniel Zeno, the Bishop of Brixen, to "catechize" in the mountain villages as a Catholic lay preacher (Laientheologe). He thus became what he himself termed a "secular Jesuit" ("weltlicher Jesuiter"). He interpreted his role not merely as that of a preacher of morality and discipline, but as a one-man vice-squad. Everywhere he looked he saw frivolity and "beastliness" ("Lüderlichkeit"). His condemnations were unrelentingly harsh.

Possibly because of his strenuous efforts for the public good, the Emperor Ferdinand II appointed him to an honorific court medical post (Erzarzt von und zu Hoffberg und Volderthurn), while the pope made him a Vatican Knight of the Golden Spur.

== Family ==
Hippolytus Guarinonius was married twice. His first wife, Charitas Thaler, bore him eight children, including one set of triplets who died shortly after their births, and underwent an emergency baptism in which each received the name, Christina followed by one of the virtues identified in Verse 13, Chapter 13 of the Apostle's First Epistle to the Corinthians (Christina Fides, Christina Spes and Christina Charitas). Two years after the death, in 1610, of his first wife he married again. His second wife, Helena von Spieß, bore him two further sons.

Another source states merely that he had many children, most of whom died young.

== Architecture ==
The St Charles Church (Karlskirche) in Volders represents a dramatic physical manifestation of Guarinonius's religious zeal. It was constructed according to his own plans, and is today easily accessible from the motorway service area on the Inn Valley Autobahn (direction Kufstein). The church, built in the style sometimes described as "Venetian Baroque", exhibits an almost oriental flamboyance: it is one of the most important sacred buildings in what remains of the Austrian Tirol. The floor-plan of the building is modelled on that of St. Peter's in Rome. Guarinonius funded the church's construction from his personal wealth, and progress was frequently interrupted when the money ran out. It was completed only on 25 July 1654, more than 34 years after the placing of the foundation stone on 2 April 1620.

Guaronini died on 31 May 1654, on Trinity Sunday. He is buried in "his" Karlskirche in Volders.

The inscription on his grave reads as follows:

ECCE VIATOR
ORBI FAMOSUS IN ARTE VIRTUTE DOCTRINA PIETATE ET NOBILITATE PRAECLARUS MEDICUS HIPPOLYTUS QUARINONIUS AB HOFFPERG ET FOLDERTHURN TRIDENTINUS HUJUSCE PRAESENTIS ECCLESIAE FUNDATOR ET EXTRUCTOR DEFUNCTUS ULTIMO DIE MAII ANNO MDCLIV JACET HIC QUI UT CUM ADIACENTE DELECTA CONIUGE SUA HELENA TOTAVE SUA FAMILIA GAUDETA AETERNA DEUM TER OPT MAX APPRECARE

Passer by, see here
The world famous Hippolytus Guarinonius, known for his virtue, doctrinal piety and nobility, physician to the Imperial Court and the Volders district, died on the final day of May 1754 and lies here beside his wife, ready to rejoice with the wider family in Christ in praise for the everlasting God

He died at the end of May 1654, soon after the completion of the church, and two months before its formal consecration He was himself buried at the Karlskirche, where his body lies beneath a marble slab before the steps of the "Epiphany alter", together with that of his wife and two of his sons.

Guarinonius also instigated the building of the Stiftsalm Chapel in Voldertal and the Borgia Chapel in Volderwald (Tulfes). The chapel at the Volderer Wildbad has burned down several times, and the present structure therefore only goes back to Guarinonius indirectly.

On the far side of the Inn Valley, the plans for the little church dedicated to St Anna in Baumkirchen were probably also drawn up by Guarinonius.

== Writings ==
Guarinonius contribution as a writer on medical and religious topics is seen by some as even more notable than his architecture and building work.

His most important written work, of which the initial volume was published in Ingolstadt in 1610, was entitled "Die Grewel der Verwüstung menschlichen Geschlechts", a seven volume work which, by its content and structure, defies any simple classification. Topics include doctors and apothecaries, the ducking of women, digestion, mountains and plains, eaters and stuffers, Engadine comedies, calendar discrepancies, anecdotes about Eulenspiegel, foxes' tails, fencing schools. Other subjects are German dog laws, how Jews and heretics love to devour meat, praise for older women, a peon of praise for guardians, rubbish and associated crime, the nature of geese and women, noodles and polenta eaten by peasants, and much more. Though its subject selection and format may appear haphazard, the "Grewel" is nevertheless a treasure trove for German philology and vernacular. It is particularly valued by scholars for insights it provides into unknown regional idioms and provincial colloquial expressions hitherto not traced to any form of written source. It is rich in allusions to contemporary German-language proverbs, speech patterns and word-play.

Of all his medical publications, "Pestilentz Guardien" (Plague recommendations), which was published following two years of an epidemic locally, became particularly widely known. This "minor treatise" like the "Grewel" before it, appeared in seven volumes. These are entitled as follows:

1. Recommendations for healthy people (" Guardi für den gesunden Menschen")
2. Recommendations for priests, nurses and grave diggers ("... für Priester, Krankenwärter und Todtengräber")
3. Recommendations for infected homes ("... für die infizierten Häuser")
4. Recommendations for cemeteries ("... für die Friedhöfe")
5. Recommendations for clothing and bedding ("... für Kleider und Wäsche")
6. Recommendations against diverse errors ("... gegen verschiedene Irrtümer")
7. Recommendations for people suffering salt and brine burn injuries ("... für Leute, die von der „Salzsur“ (Salzlauge) geschädigt und verbrannt wurden")

Also worth mentioning are his botanical publications that include "Hydrooeconomgania" and "Chylosophiae academicae artis Aesculapiae novis astris illustratae tomi duo" which appeared respectively in 1640 and 1648.

== Botanical studies ==
A herbarium assembled by Guarinonius was gifted by the Wilten Foundation to the Tyrolean State Museum in 1876. It is one of the earliest collections of this nature in central Europe. Compiled between 1610 and 1630, it comprises a book format herbarium with wooden covers and bevelled edges. It starts with a 13-page Latin/German index, which is followed by 106 pages incorporating 633 pressed and dried plant parts, originally collected in the Innsbruck area.
