= Hannes Priesch =

Austrian-American artist

- Born: 1954 (age 71–72); Eggersdorf bei Graz, Austria
- Education: Academy of Fine Arts Vienna
- Website: www.hannespriesch.com

Hannes Priesch (born 1954) is an Austrian-American multi-disciplinary artist based in Graz, Austria. He is known for his diverse body of work that encompasses painting, drawing and installation art.

== Biography ==
Priesch was born in 1954, in Eggersdorf bei Graz, Austria, to Ottilie and Johann Priesch. He attended Salvatorkolleg Graz and Bundesgymnasium und Bundesrealgymnasium Carnerigasse in Graz where he completed his studies. In 1973, Priesch enrolled at the Academy of Fine Arts Vienna, where he studied under Max Weiler. He continued to work as Weiler's assistant until 1980.

Priesch began his professional artistic career in 1977. In 1979, he was honored with the Steirischer Kunstpreisträger (Styria Art Prize). His inaugural solo exhibition took place in 1980 at Galerie nächst St. Stephan, curated by Austrian art historian Peter Gorsen. Later that year, Priesch represented Austria at the Biennale des Jeunes Artistes in Paris. In 1981, Priesch collaborated with Peter Rumpf and Brigitte Pokornik, showcasing their art at the Trigon Biennial during the Steirischer Herbst festival at the Neue Galerie, Graz. In 1983, Priesch co-founded REM, an artist group based in Vienna, along with several prominent Austrian artists. The group remained active until 1990, hosting their exhibitions at a gallery located in Mozartplatz, Vienna.

In 1984, Priesch made two significant contributions to group exhibition at the 21er Haus in Vienna, namely "Orwell und die Gegenwart" and "Traum vom Raum". He held a solo exhibition at the Neue Galerie and Zagreb City Museum in 1987, with catalog texts by Wilfried Skreiner, ManfreDu Schuicken, Josef Hartmann and Walter Obholzer. In 1990, Priesch was sponsored by the Austrian Ministry of Arts, Culture, Civil Service and Sports for an artist residency at MWMWM Gallery in Chicago, Illinois where he worked for five years. In 1997, Priesch showcased a significant installation, "Set of 11 Maps" during the Steirischer Herbst festival at the Galerie Schafschetzy in Graz. "Set of 11 Maps" consisted of eleven pairs of pants, each appearing as if it contains an actual body. Every pair of stylistically distinct trousers assumes a unique pose, symbolizing various personalities. In 2015, Priesch collaborated with Galerie Artepari in Graz where he held two solo exhibitions, "Wir alle müssen Opfer bringen" in 2015 and "Chapel of Pain" in 2017. In 2020, he initiated a six-part artist book series titled Wörks published by VfmK in Vienna. The book received positive reviews from several art news outlets.

Between 2018 and 2023, Priesch held multiple solo and group exhibitions at various venues including Museum Liaunig, Kunsthaus Mürzzuschlag, University of Vienna, Galerie Artepari, Kunsthaus Graz and others.

Priesch's artworks and installations are part of the permanent collections at several prestigious museums across Europe including institutions such as Albertina in Viena, Mumok, Academy of Fine Arts Vienna, Universalmuseum Joanneum, Artothek des Bundes, Lentos Art Museum, Admont Abbey and others.
