= Andreas Oxner =

Purported Austrian ritual murder victim

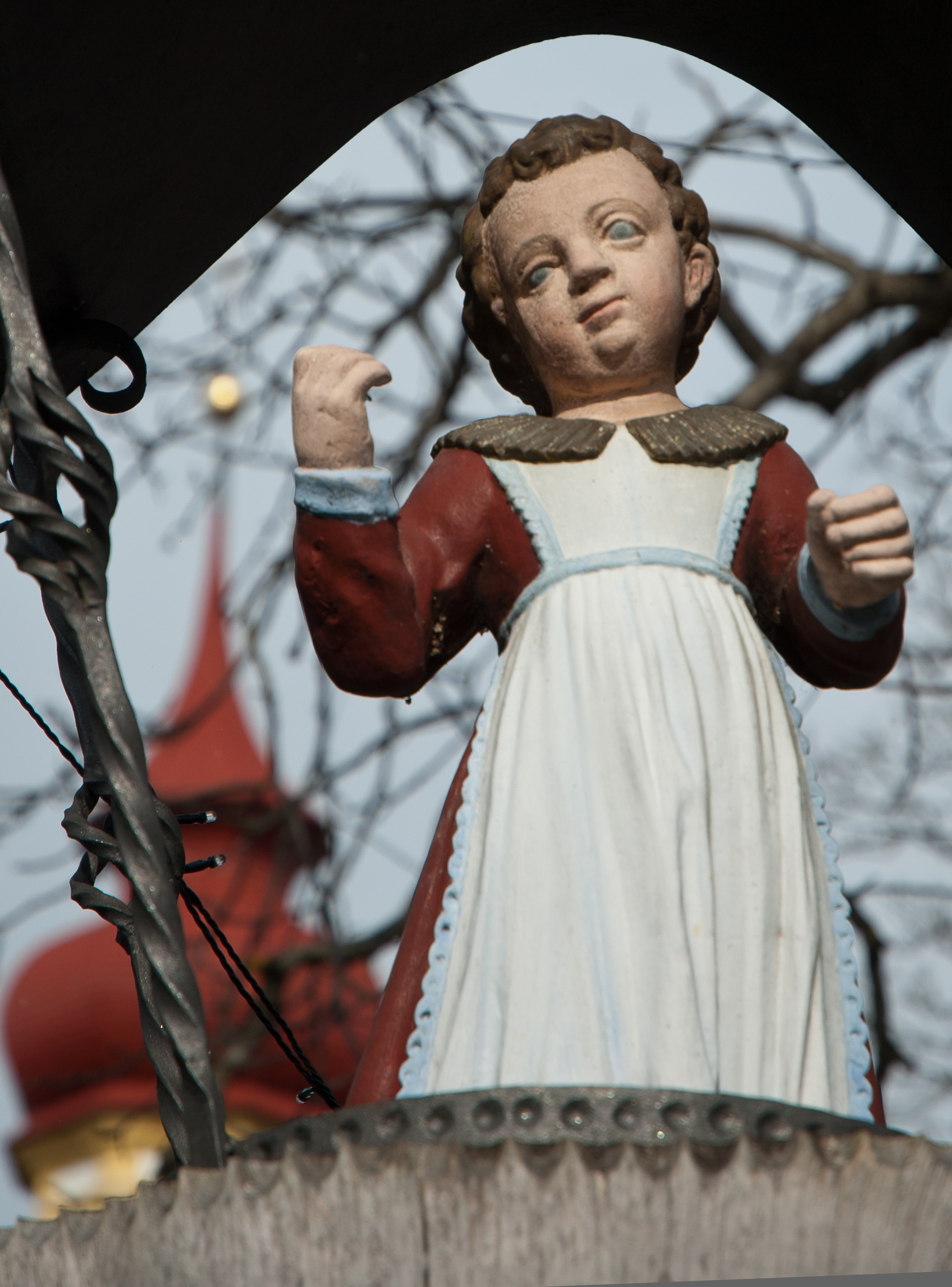
- Andreas Oxner

Child of Judenstein
- Born: Anderl Oxner von Rinn c. 1459; Austria
- Died: 12 July 1462 (aged 3); Rinn, Austria
- Venerated in: Folk Catholicism
- Beatified: 1752 by Pope Benedict XIV
- Major shrine: Judenstein
- Controversy: Blood libel
- Catholic cult suppressed: 1994 by Reinhold Stecher

Anderl (Andreas) Oxner von Rinn, also known as Andreas Oxner, (c. 1459 – 12 July 1462) is a Blessed of the Roman Catholic Church. The three-year-old boy was said to have been ritually murdered by the Jews in the village of Rinn (Northern Tyrol, currently part of Austria).

== Initial accusations ==
Anderl was supposedly the child of day laborers Simon and Maria Oxner. After his father's death, his mother allegedly entrusted the child to his uncle, Johann Meyer, an innkeeper. On 12 July 1462, Anderl disappeared, and his mother found his body hanging from a tree in a nearby forest. The uncle claimed that he had sold the child to people described in one source as 'travelling merchants' and in multiple as Jews. According to Hyppolyte Guarinoni, the story did not take on the blood libel superstition that Jews had murdered the boy until 1475, thirteen years after the death.

== Tale ==
The tale of the Anderl's ritual murder, known as Der Judenstein (The Jews' Stone), is largely part of a Tyrolian oral tradition and only a few written versions exist. It was recorded by the Grimm Brothers in Deutsche Sagen (1816/1818).

In the year 1462 in the village of Rinn in Tyrol a number of Jews convinced a poor farmer to surrender his small child to them in return for a large sum of money. They took the child out into the woods, where, on a large stone, they martyred it to death in the most unspeakable manner. From that time the stone has been called the Jews' Stone. Afterward they hung the mutilated body on a birch tree not far from a bridge.

The child's mother was working in a field when the murder took place. She suddenly thought of her child, and without knowing why, she was overcome with fear. Meanwhile, three drops of fresh blood fell onto her hand, one after the other. Filled with terror she rushed home and asked for her child. Her husband brought her inside and confessed what he had done. He was about to show her the money that would free them from poverty, but it had turned into leaves. Then the father became mad and died from sorrow, but the mother went out and sought her child. She found it hanging from the tree and, with hot tears, took it down and carried it to the church at Rinn. It is lying there to this day, and the people look on it as a holy child. They also brought the Jews' Stone there.

According to legend a shepherd cut down the birch tree, from which the child had hung, but when he attempted to carry it home he broke his leg and died from the injury.

— Jacob and Wilhelm Grimm, Deutsche Sagen (1816/1818), no. 353. Trans. D. L. Ashliman, 2005.

In 1619, Hyppolyte Guarinoni claimed to have heard a story about a little boy buried in Rinn who had been murdered by Jews, and dreamt that his year of death was 1462. While research suggests that a child named Andreas Oxner might have never actually existed, celebrations of the cult began in 1621 and, by the late 17th century, they occurred in all the Tyrol region.

Around 1677–85, the inhabitants of Rinn solemnly transferred Andrew's body to Rinn, imitating the cult of Simon of Trent. The alleged scene of the crime, known as the "Judenstein" (or Jews' Stone), became a place of pilgrimage and locus of antisemitism in area.

== Veneration ==
In 1752, Pope Benedict XIV beatified Andreas, but in 1755 refused to canonize him and stated that the Roman Church did not formally venerate him.

Popular theatrical performances based on the writings of Guarinoni were performed until 1954 and facilitated the spread of the blood libel legend. The Brothers Grimm revived the tale in 1816 when they published the first volume of their German legends. In 1893, a book appeared, Four Tyrolian Child Victims of Hassidic Fanaticism by Viennese priest Josef Deckert.

The cult of Anderl von Rinn persisted in Austria until the 1990s. In 1985, Bishop of Innsbruck Reinhold Stecher ordered the body transferred from the church to the churchyard of Judenstein, and forbade his cult in 1994. Some ultra-conservative Christians still make a procession to his grave every year.

== See also ==
Other children whose deaths in medieval times gave rise to the persecution of the Jews:

- Harold of Gloucester
- Little Saint Hugh of Lincoln
- Robert of Bury
- Simon of Trent
- Werner of Oberwesel
- William of Norwich
- Gabriel of Białystok
