= Tyrol Panorama Museum =

Museum in Innsbruck, Austria

Coordinates: 47°15′01″N 11°24′06″E

Tirol Panorama with the Museum of the Imperial Infantry
- Tirol Panorama mit Kaiserjägermuseum
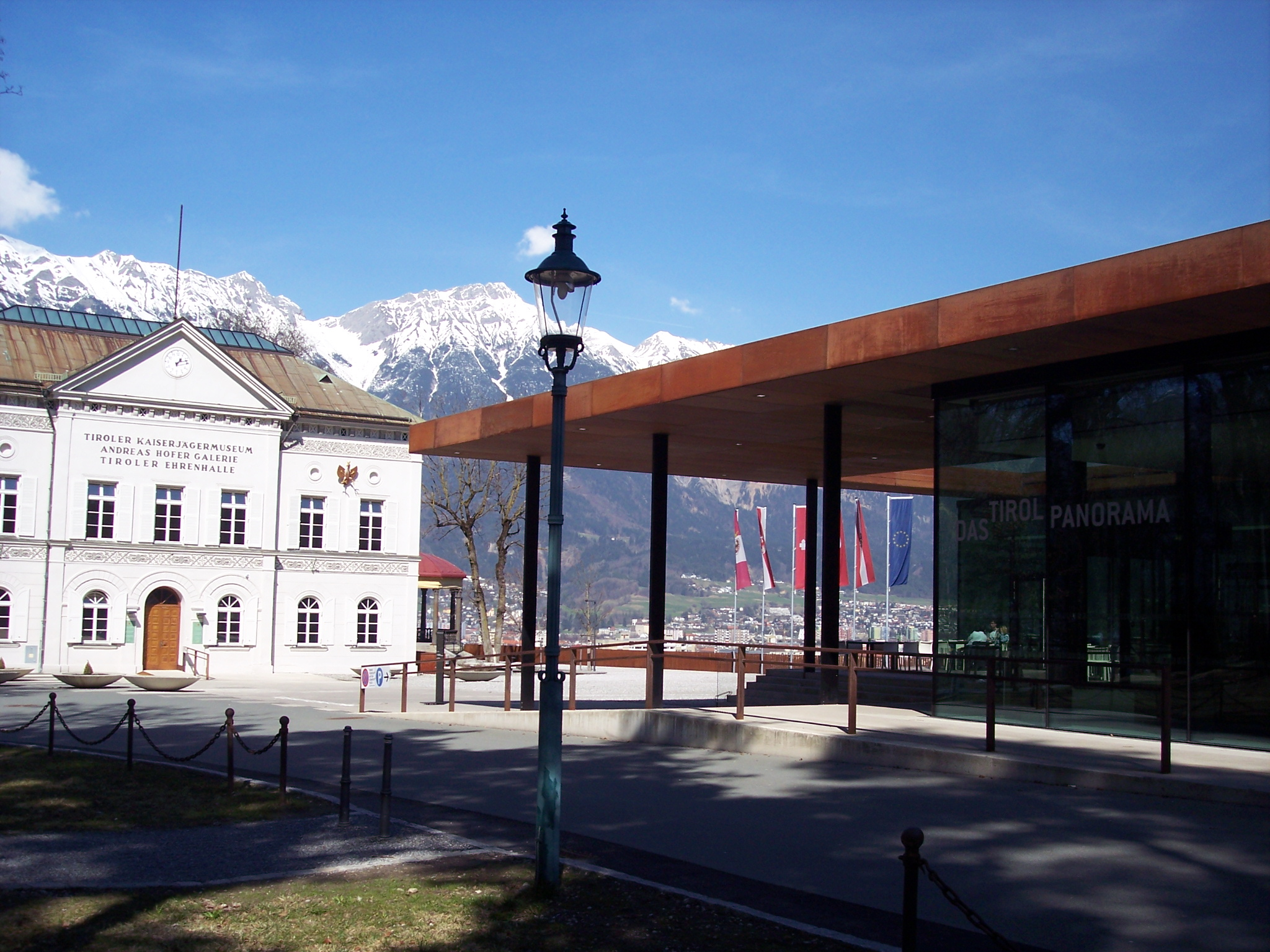
- External view of the Tyrol Panorama (right)
- Established: 12 March 2011
- Location: 6020 Innsbruck, Bergisel 1-2
- Director: Sonia Buchroithner
- Architects: Büro Stoll Wagner sowie Architektenbüro HG Merz
- Owner: Tiroler Landesmuseen
- Website: Tirol Panorama mit Kaiserjägermuseum

The Tirol Panorama with the Museum of the Imperial Infantry or Tirol Panorama (German: Das Tirol Panorama mit Kaiserjägermuseum) is a museum in Innsbruck in the Austrian state of Tyrol, which is mainly important because it houses the Innsbruck Giant Panorama Painting.

== Location and access ==
The Tyrol Panorama Museum is at Bergisel in the south of the city. It is accessible on public transport using the IVB lines, Sightseer, Lines 1 and 6, as well as the Stubai Valley Railway and Stubai Valley Bus. A further enhancement is planned in the shape of another bus line for the residents on the Bergisel.

== Exhibition ==
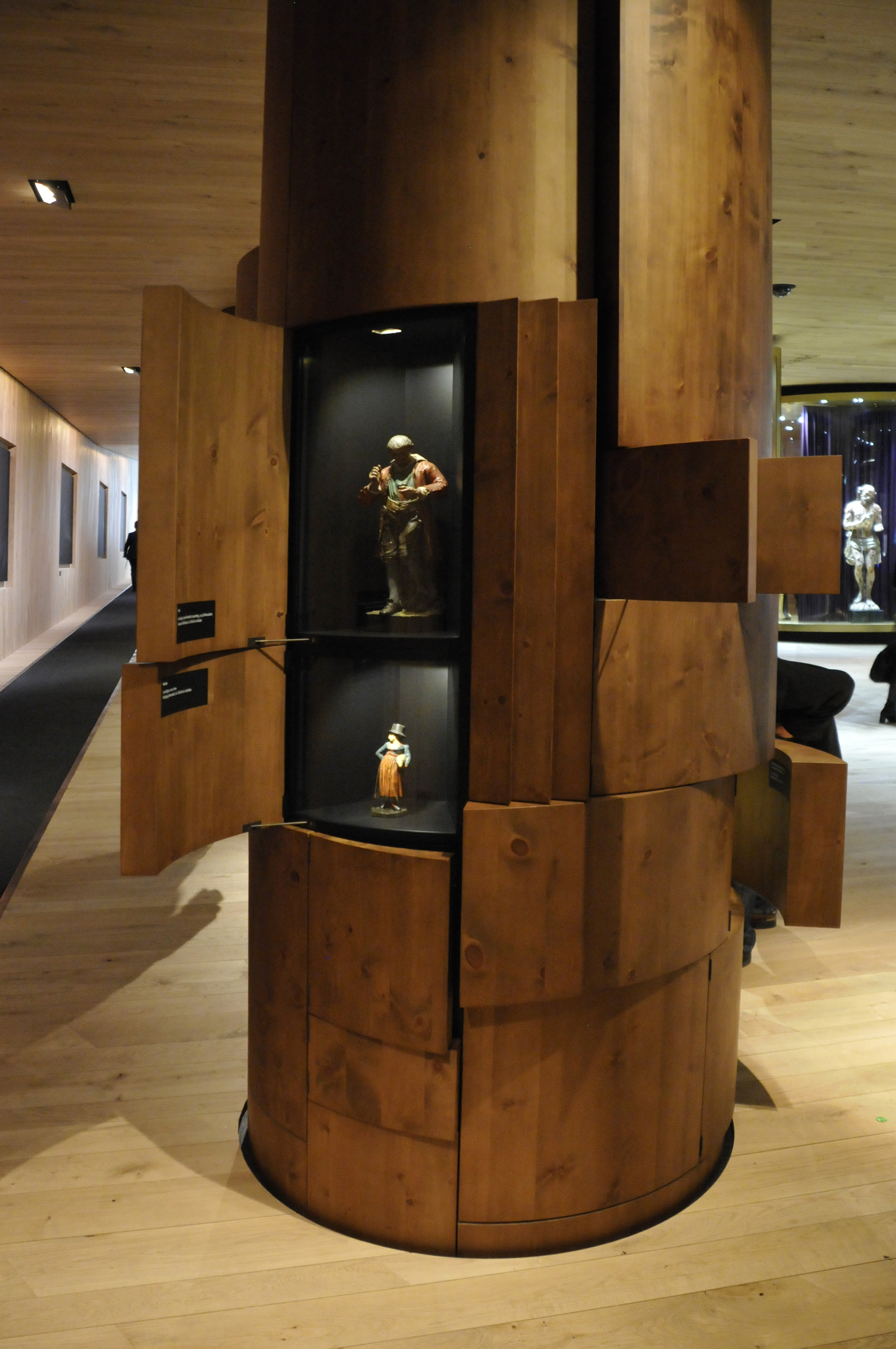
Exhibits in the museum

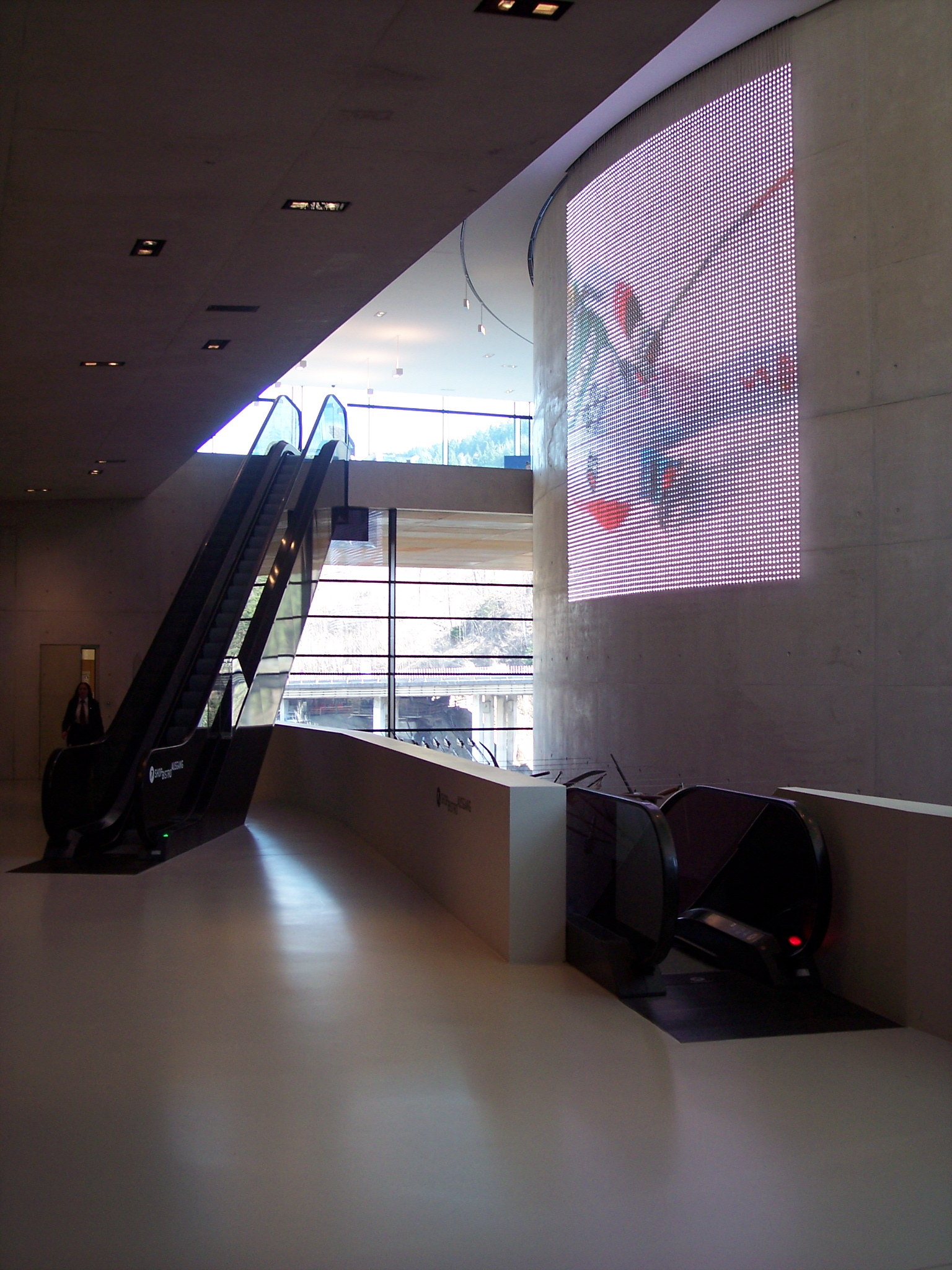
Interior view with the rotunda of the painting

The Giant Panoramic Painting, that was transferred here in September 2010, is the main exhibit of the museum. It depicts the Tyrolean Rebellion of 1809 on 1,000 square metres of canvas. Another focal point of the Tyrol Panorama is the permanent exhibition called the “Tyrolean Stage” ("Schauplatz Tirol"). Here, the themes of religion, nature, politics and man will be used to explain the "Tyrolean myth" by using exhibits. Furthermore, the new house is connected underground to the Kaiserjäger Museum, which is a "museum within the museum". The exhibition area is visually divided into four thematic areas. “Nature” is presented in a 40-metre-long showcase in which, among other things, a cable car gondola and stuffed animals, such as a bear and a beaver, are exhibited. “Politics" is located in the middle of the room, where, for example, the horse's head of the so-called "Aluminum Duce" monument in Bolzano or the valuable 1511 ‘’Landlibell’’ of Emperor Maximilian I are found. Interactive "tree trunks" show the "man" or "Tyrolean types". Here you can also find, for example, the pipe of former provincial governor, Eduard Wallnöfer, or a self-portrait of the painter, Anna Stainer-Knittel. The exhibits on "Religion" are housed in large glass showcases at the back of the main entrance foyer to the Kaiserjäger Museum. Among other things, a baroque pulpit and fresco designs from St. Theresa’s Church by Max Weiler are displayed here. Weiler mural of the “Archduke Ferdinand II and Philippine Welser at Schloss Ambras“ was transported to the Tyrol Panorama on 21 February 2011, where it hangs in the restaurant. From 1953 to 2000 the painting was hung in the dining room of the old Hotel Tyrol in Innsbruck. The painting weighs a tonne, is 28 square metres in area and was painted in 24 individual sections.

== History and controversies ==
On the initiative of the former governor of Tyrol, Herwig van Staa, the museum was originally to be opened in 2009 on the 200th anniversary of the Battle of Bergisel. Its construction costs were estimated at six million euros, but this was significantly exceeded, at over 25 million euros. It was opened on 12 March 2011 as part of a large celebration. The opening was attended by 6,500 people. This led to a flash mob initiated by alternative groups to draw attention to the alleged lack of cultural support from the state of Tyrol. The initial reception for the Tyrol Panorama was positive however: 50,000 visitors were received in just the first 2½ months. Many critics of the transfer of the circular painting also changed their opinion and are now convinced by the new location.

The relocation of the giant circular painting had already been criticized by the Federal Monuments Office and International Panorama Council as being unjustifiable from the point of view of the protection of the ensemble. The Federal Ministry for Education, Art and Culture, on the other hand, judged the transfer of the giant circular painting into the Tyrol Panorama as a better conservation solution. Some critics have described parts of the exhibition as an arbitrary hotchpotch of exhibits. In addition, the lack of transport connections and procedures for leasing the attached restaurant were also criticised. On the occasion of a visit on 3 July 2011, Claudia Schmied, Federal Minister of Education, Art and Culture said: "The giant painting has now found an ideal location." She was pleased that "the large and not uncontroversial project had now come to such a successful conclusion."

== Literature ==
- Isabelle Brandauer, u.a.: Das Tirol Panorama, Rund um den Mythos Tirol, Hrsg. Edition Alpina, Innsbruck 2011, ISBN 978-3-900122-05-8
