= Von Wörndle =

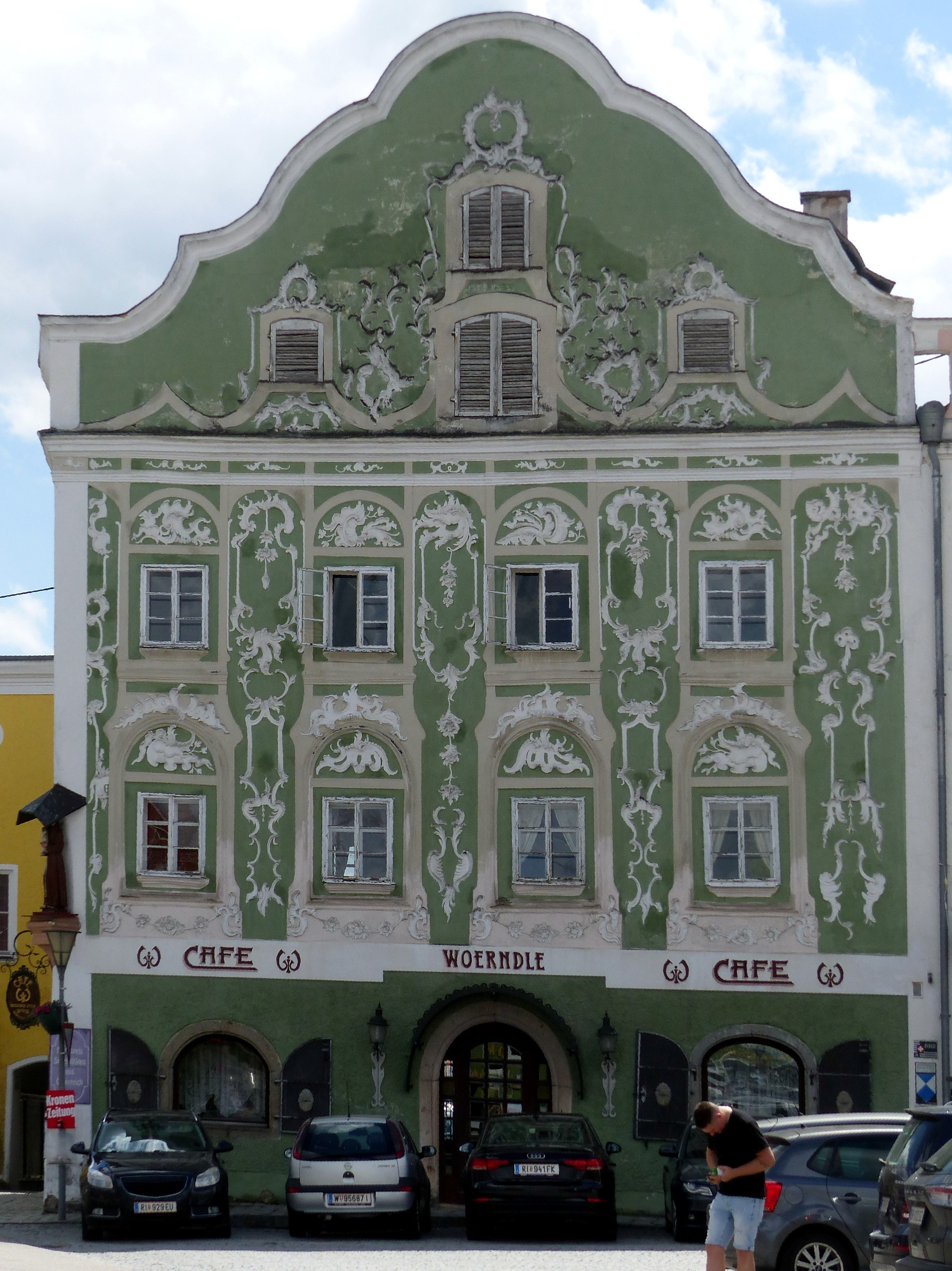
House of the Wörndle family, Obernberg am Inn

The Von Wörndle is an old Austrian noble family from Tyrol. Their nobility was reinstated in 1763 by Maria Theresa, as a reward for Johann Anton von Wörndle and his military and patriotic services. Throughout history, members of the family distinguished themselves as soldiers, lawyers, painters and held the title of Ritter.

== Notable members ==
- Philip von Wörndle (1755–1818), Tyrolese lawyer and a commander in Landsturm against Napoleon
- Edmund von Wörndle (1827–1906), Austrian landscape painter
- August von Wörndle (1829–1902), Austrian painter

== See also ==
- Wörndle
