= Our Lady of Absam =

Title for the Virgin Mary

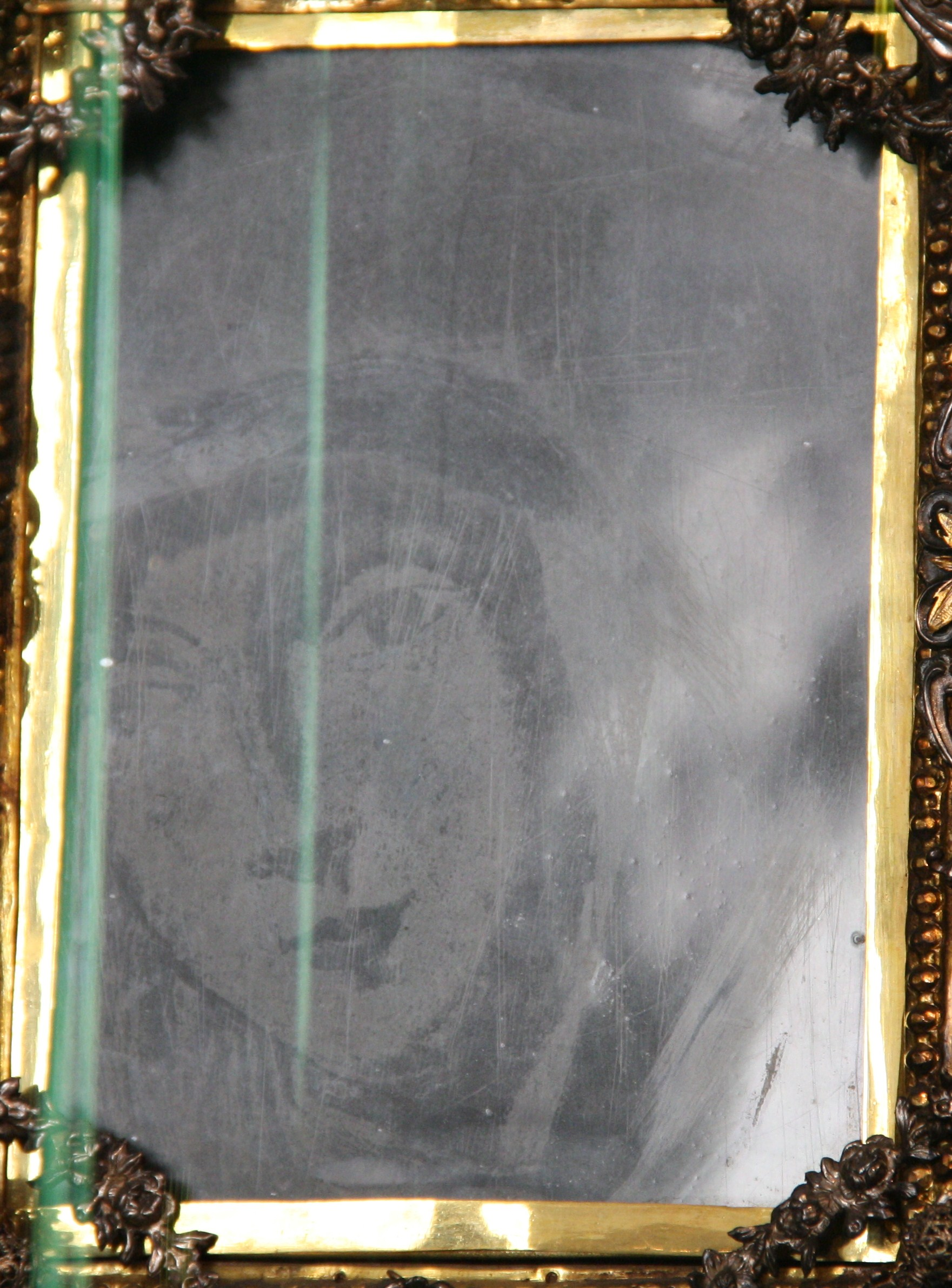
- Location: Absam, Tyrol, Austria
- Date: January 17, 1797
- Shrine: St. Michael's Basilica, Absam, Austria

Our Lady of Absam is a Catholic title of Mary, mother of Jesus, associated with a 1797 Marian apparition in the alpine village of Absam, a municipality of Austria. Unlike traditional Marian apparitions, this apparition of the Virgin Mary was said to leave a permanent memento in the form an image of the Virgin etched into a windowpane without a formal appearance by the Virgin. The windowpane itself has been associated with numerous miracles and healings.

Pope John Paul II declared Saint Michael's Church in Absam–the parish church where the image is currently enshrined–a minor basilica on June 24, 2000 (now known as the Basilika St. Michael), due to the popularity of the church as a site of pilgrimage.

== Apparition ==
On January 17, 1797, between 3:00 and 4:00 in the afternoon, an 18-year-old girl named Rosina Buecher was sitting at the dinner table and sewing. With no particular intervention, Buecher was prompted to look out the window near her where strange markings had seemed to appear on the window on their own. The girl called her mother to see the unusual phenomenon, and together, they looked upon the face etched into the window and concluded that it was that of the Virgin Mary. In the image, the Virgin seemed to be crying, as a tear drop could be noted coming out of her right eye. Neighbors and the parish priest were summarily called to the Buecher home to see the window for themselves.

Reasons for the appearance remain a matter of speculation. One theory that has been hypothesized is that Rosina's mother suspected it to be a grim premonition, as both her husband and her son, Johann–Rosina's brother–worked in the salt mines. Conversely, it has also been believed that the image was instead a positive sign, promising the safe return of the two men to their home. Both men did indeed return home after barely escaping a work-related accident.

=== Recounting by Johann Buecher ===
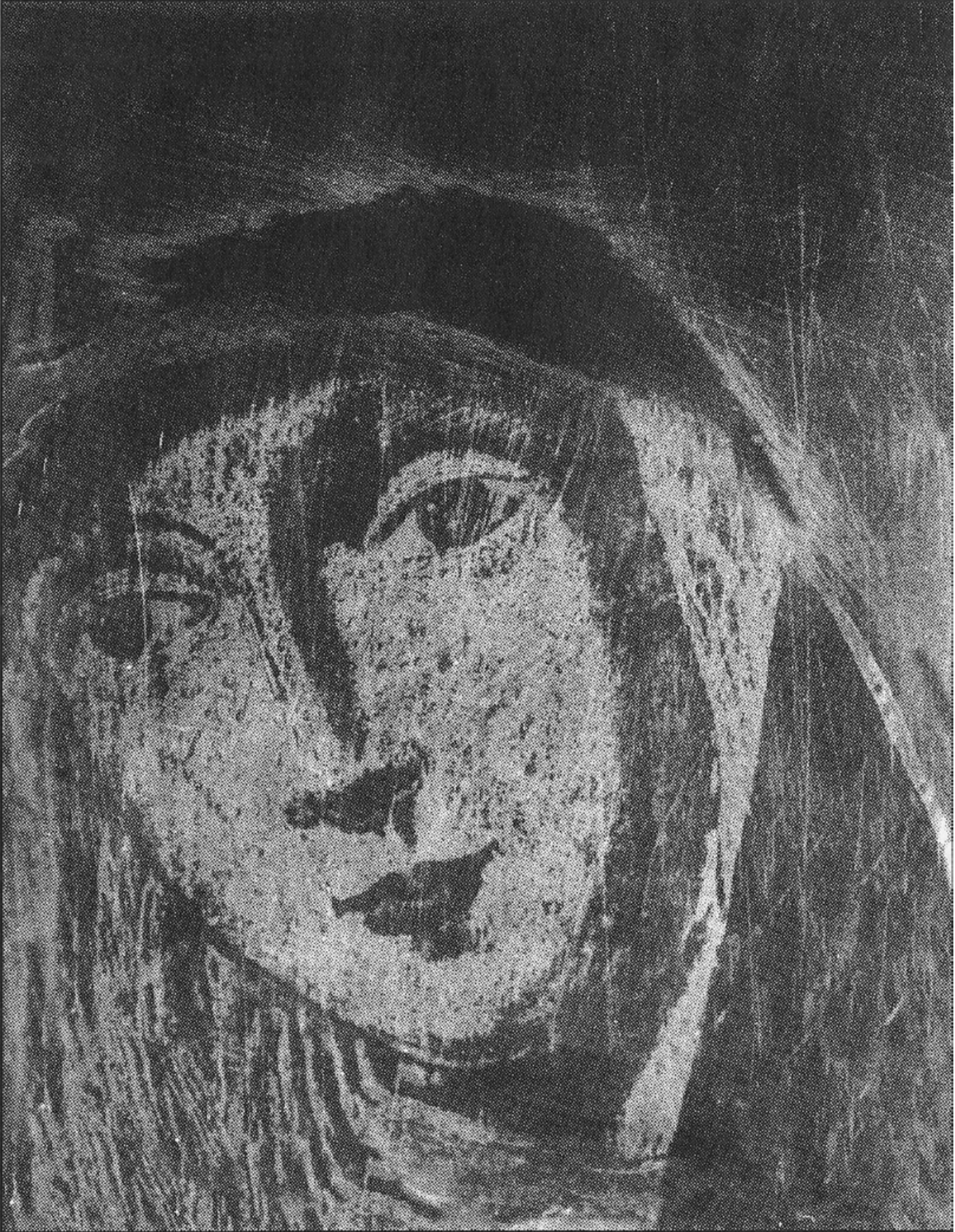
A close-up view of the etching.

In his old age, Johann Buecher recounted the following rendition of the apparition in 1857:

"On 17 January 1797, my sister, a grown girl (18 years of age) by the name of Rosina was sitting at the table by the window on the ground-floor room sewing. She then – between 3 and 4 o'clock – suddenly looked up and saw what had never been seen before, drawn on a window pane, an image of Mary, the Mother of God. She called to her mother, who was also present, but in another part of the room. Mother hurried over and was initially not a little frightened, when she saw the image of the Holy Virgin, as she thought an accident could have befallen father or myself in the salt-mine where we worked. She said to sister Rosanna that we should pray; and that is what happened. After saying their prayers, the mother wiped the picture with a cloth, because she thought it was steamed up, but look, scarcely had she wiped it off, but it was back just as it was before. The apparition of the image took place on a Tuesday, and on the Thursday me and my father came home perfectly well from the mountain. We looked with joy and amazement at what we had occurred. On 17 January 1797 I was in my 16th year and have retained in my memory everything that happened on that day."

=== Examination of the windowpane ===
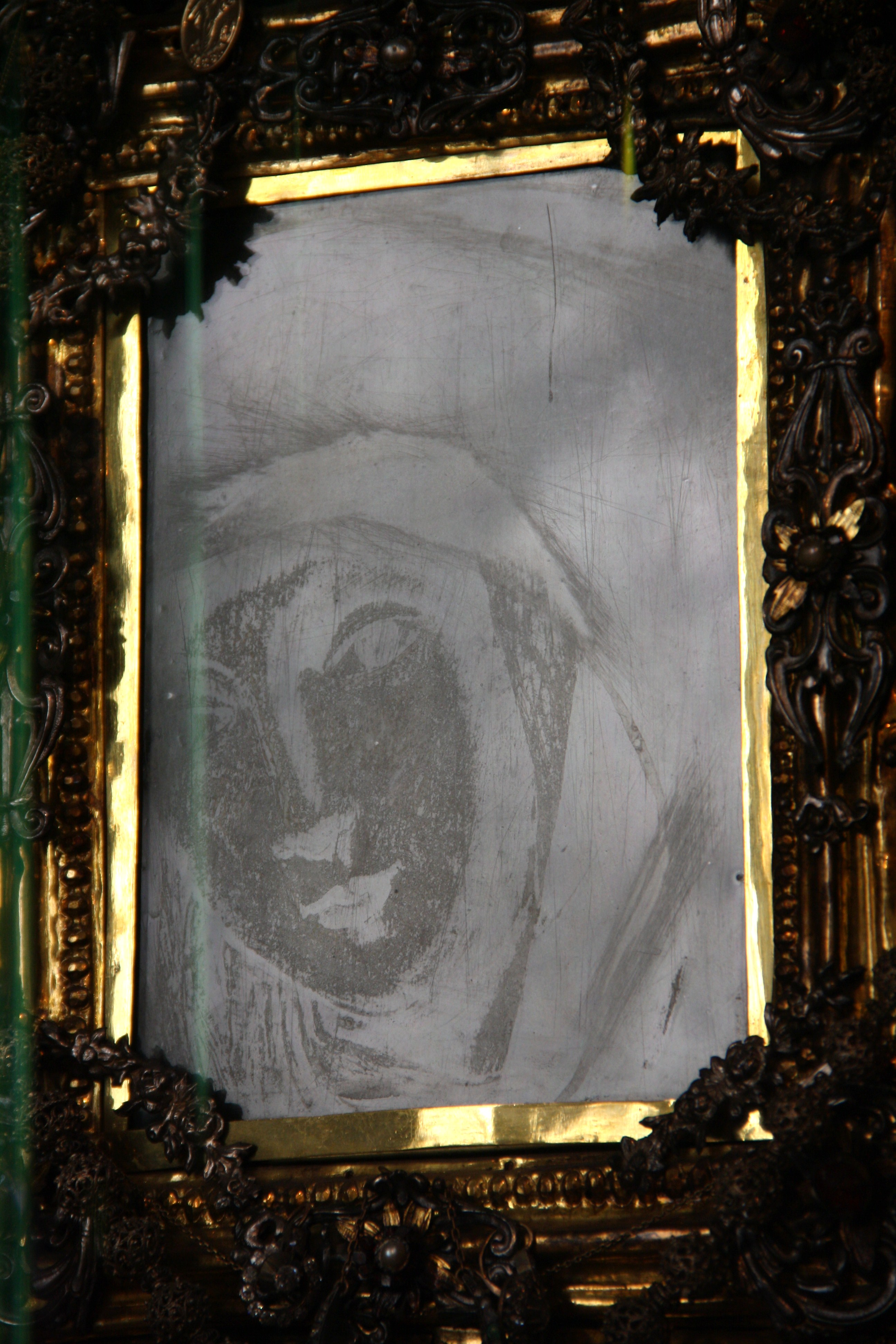
A different angle taken of the miraculous windowpane.

The parish priest took the windowpane for further examination by experts soon after its removal from the home. They discovered that as soon as the windowpane was submerged in water, the image would disappear, but would reappear again. Attempts to chemically test and treat the window with sand and acid were futile, and the image of the Virgin Mary remained permanently on the window.

A commission from the University of Innsbruck was set up to investigate the matter and consisted of two professors of chemistry, a mathematician, a painter, Joseph Schöpf and two master glaziers. The commission found that applications of chemicals, physical rubbing, and even a mirror grinder with polish could not erase the image. One of the two glaziers then tried to remove the image with an abrasive. With the application of a lead polish, the glass allegedly became transparent and the image had disappeared, leading the commission to report, "As a result of the investigation, a quite natural cause has to be assumed, and so the image should not be regarded as a miracle."

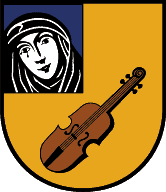
The Coat of Arms of Absam, Austria, which prominently depicts Our Lady of Absam on its upper left quarter.

=== Theories behind the image's creation ===
One theory behind the origin of the etching is that it may have been the work of a young man named Georg Johannes Stebenbauer, the wealthy son of a prominent painter. Stebenbauer was said to have loved Rosina Buecher and wanted to create a painting of her, which Buecher allegedly allowed him to do, but only on the condition that she would not notice him doing so. As an alternative to this, he instead set on capturing Buecher's reflection by attaching a piece of paper, soaked in an unspecified substance made to react to light, to Buecher's window. Stebenbauer had hoped she would longingly gaze out of the window, supposedly as she always did, and capture her reflection in this way. After removing the chemically treated paper from the window, he failed to have the image of her reflection appear on the paper. If true, this method of imagery would have predated the formal invention of photography by approximately 25 years. News of the unusual image on Buecher's window soon spread throughout Absam, and Stebenbauer reportedly left Innsbruck in despair, as Buecher apparently renounced the world as a nun and entered a convent. She later assumed the name "Maria Walburga".

== Pilgrimage and enshrinement ==
The pane was returned to the Buecher family, but later given to Saint Michael's church on June 24, 1797, for veneration. To encourage the family to donate the pane to the church, villagers reportedly said, "Where the Son stays, there must be a place for the Mother too." A festive procession in reverence of the Virgin was held on the same day, rife with bells and celebration. Pope John Paul II declared Saint Michael's Church a minor basilica on the 203rd anniversary of the windowpane's official placement in the church, on June 24, 2000.
