= Runne =

Runne may refer to:

- Ossi Runne (born 1927), male Finnish trumpeter
- Eha Rünne (born 1963), female shot putter and discus thrower from Estonia
- Runne Mountains in the fictional world of Terry Brooks' Shannara series
- Runne, old name of the municipality Rinn in Tyrol, Austria
