= Philip von Wörndle =

Philip von Wörndle (9 July 1755 - 2 August 1818) was a Tyrolese commander in the Landsturm, who distinguished himself in the wars against Napoleon.

== Biography ==
Born in Hotting, into the Wörndle family, as a son of Johann Anton von Wörndle, Chief justice in Sonnenburg, whose nobility was reinstated in 1763 by Maria Theresa, as a reward for his military and patriotic services. He received his Doctor of Law degree from the University of Innsbruck in 1779. Philip was grandfather of Edmund von Wörndle and August von Wörndle, both prominent Austrian painters.

== Awards ==
Von Wörndle received the Tyrolese commemorative medal and the gold imperial medal for his defense of the Puster Valley during the War of the Fifth Coalition.
