= Wörndle =

Wörndle is a German surname. Notable people with the surname include:

- Matthias Wörndle (1909–1942), German cross-country skier
- Roman Wörndle (1913–1942), German alpine skier

== See also ==
- Von Wörndle
