= Absam =

- Municipality
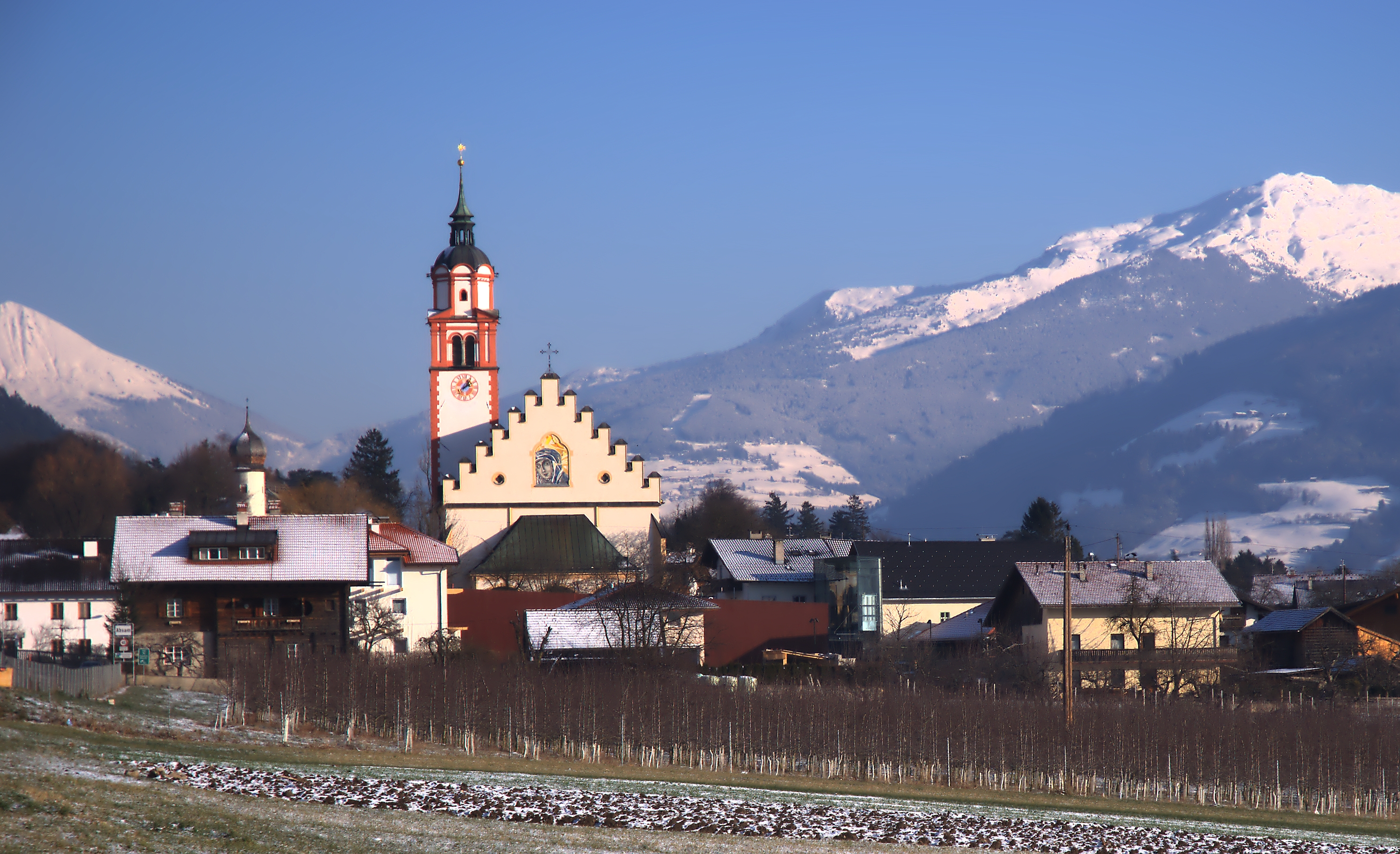

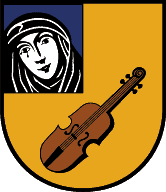
- Coat of arms

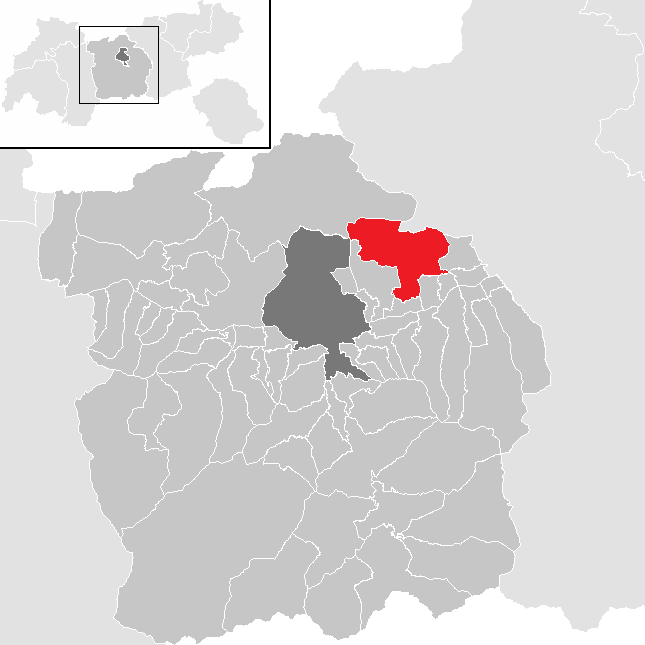
- Location in the district

- Location within Austria
- Coordinates: 47°17′00″N 11°30′00″E
- Country: Austria
- State: Tyrol
- District: Innsbruck Land

Government
  - Mayor: Manfred Schafferer (SPÖ)

Area
  - Total: 51.93 km^{2} (20.05 sq mi)

Population (2021)
  - Total: 7,319
  - Density: 140.9/km^{2} (365.0/sq mi)
- Time zone: UTC+1 (CET)
  - Summer (DST): UTC+2 (CEST)
- Postal code: 6067
- Area code: 05223
- Vehicle registration: IL
- Website: www.absam.at

Absam is a municipality in the Innsbruck-Land District, Tyrol (Austria) situated at an altitude of 632 m, which had an area of 51.92 km^{2} and 6,776 inhabitants as January 2015.

== Geography ==
Absam is 15 km from Innsbruck, in the lower Inn Valley (Unterinntal), at the slopes of the Zunterkopf Haller group, north of Hall in Tirol to which is connected with the regional road (Landesstraße) L 225, while the L 372 is the road connecting with Innsbruck via Mühlau, Arzl, Rum and Thaur.

It is possible to reach the village by using bus lines 501, 502 and 503 from Innsbruck.

The highest point in the municipality is the summit of Große Bettelwurf at altitude of 2775 m.

The neighbour municipalities are: Baumkirchen, Fritzens, Gnadenwald, Hall in Tirol, Innsbruck, Mils, Tyrol, Scharnitz, Thaur, Vomp.

== History ==
=== Origin ===
The origin of a prehistoric settlement in Absam is not sure, although a disk pommel of a sword and a brooch of copper were found there dating to 1500 BC. Traces of Roman settlements have not been found, a coin dating from the time of Diocletian has been discovered, though the Romans had conquered the Tyrol in 15 AD. The place names were of the Roman period, including "Abazanes", which became Absam. Abazanes was mentioned for the first time in 995, in a document kept in the records of the Diocese of Brixen; at that time the Bishop of Augsburg was the owner of most of the land in the region, which was administered by the Maierhof. The village, in 1282, belonged to the parish of Thaur that covered the entire region. In 1288 the name "Abzan" appeared in the register of the lands of Meinhard, Duke of Carinthia, and in the fourteenth century Absam was cited 14 times in the documents including a citation, on September 21, 1331, concerning the appointment of church to parish, until then affiliated with Thaur.

Absam is located in the area, along with Hall in Tirol and Thaur, of a salt mine, a source of income for the sovereign of the time. The documents reported the beginning of the mining in 1232. Between the sixteenth and seventeenth century the production of salt culminated, so that in 1615 were 547 workers employed in the extraction which, benefiting from a good salary, contributed to the development of trade in the village. At the same time there was a decisive step towards the industrialization of Absam, due to the energy produced by the stream Baubach, with the opening of sawmills, forges and mills and the development of coppersmith crafts, so that the firm of Oswald Kofler provided for the production of fifteen thousand sheets of copper for the roof of the church of Schwaz. In 1809 during the Tyrolean Rebellion 73 shooters of Absam joined the Tyrolean troops under the command of Josef Speckbacher.

In 1845, Absam, opened his first factory, spinning and weaving company Faistenberger, followed by others including a foundry, chocolate, boot and paint factories and a metal carpentry, aiding industrial development while mining, because of new extraction techniques and lower world prices, was in decline. As result mining in Tyrol closed on September 5, 1967. The Swarovski company moved to Absam the Optik department in 1949 in the neighbourhood of Eichat where, during the last war, the Wehrmacht built a barracks.

== Population ==
Historical population
Year	Pop.	±%
1869	1,256	—
1880	1,262	+0.5%
1890	1,242	−1.6%
1900	1,482	+19.3%
1910	1,956	+32.0%
1923	2,114	+8.1%
1934	2,473	+17.0%
1939	3,456	+39.7%
1951	3,885	+12.4%
1961	4,640	+19.4%
1971	5,361	+15.5%
1981	5,402	+0.8%
1991	5,834	+8.0%
2001	6,362	+9.1%
2011	6,700	+5.3%
2015	6,776	+1.1%

=== Coat-of-arms ===
The emblem of Absam is quartered. The first depicts the face of the Virgin Mary, symbolizing the divine appearance in 1797, the remaining part has been a violin on gold background, in memory of the luthier Jakobus Stainer, who lived in Absam. The emblem was adopted on July 20, 1965.

== Sights ==
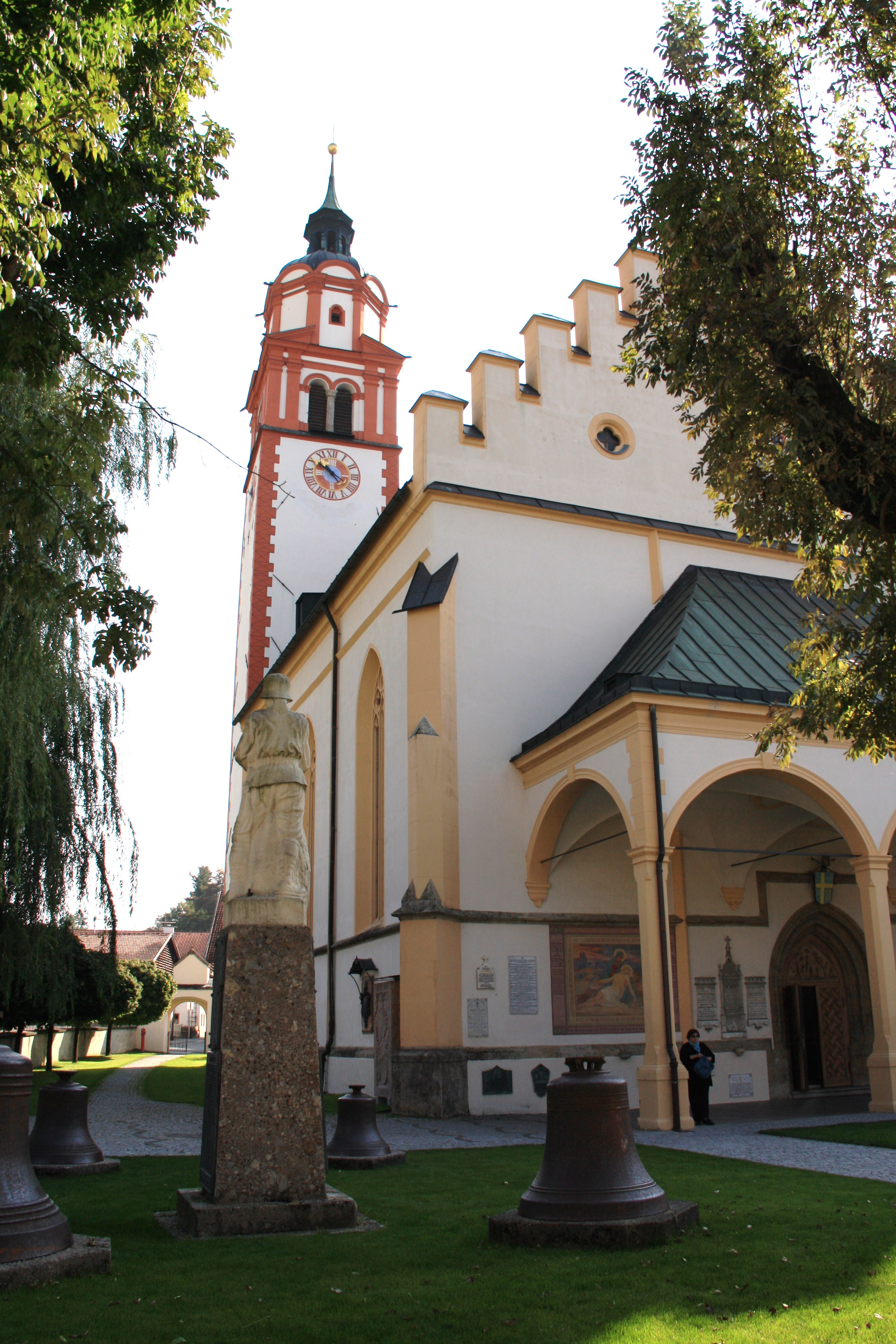
St. Michael the Archangel's Basilica.

=== Religious architecture ===
==== Basilica of St. Michael the Archangel ====
The first documented mention of the church of St. Michael the Archangel, as parish of Absam, dates back to September 21, 1331 by decree of the Bishop of Brixen Heinrich von Taufers. In 1413 the church was destroyed by Bavarian troops; in 1420 under the leadership of Hans Sewer from Hall in Tirol, the reconstruction began, in late Gothic style with three naves and columns, which was completed in 1440 .

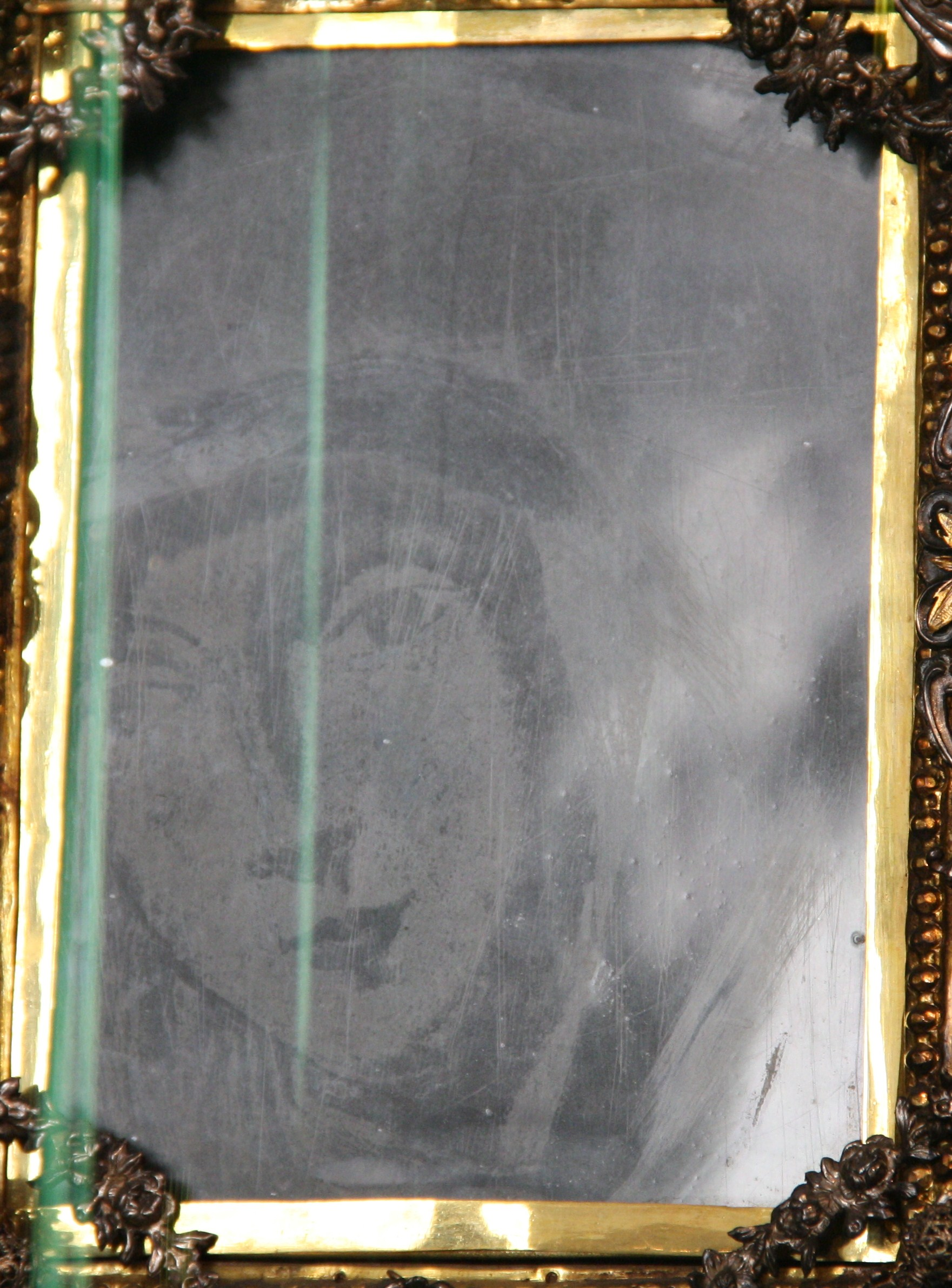
The image impressed on the window's glass on January 17, 1797.

Two works of art date from this period: an altarpiece of 1470 in late Gothic style, discovered during the restoration of 1930, depicting the Madonna with four women and a crucifix, said Fiegersche, dating to 1492. During the 1670 earthquake that struck the valley, the bell tower was damaged. It was rebuilt in 1677, replacing the pyramid roof with a dome. In 1871, the church roof was covered with copper plates. In 1776 the church was appointed as a curacy and in 1779 it was renovated internally in the Rococo style with frescoes by Josef Anton Zoller.

===== Miraculous Windowpane of Absam =====
On 24 June 1797 the image of the Virgin Mary, which appeared on the glass window of the peasant Rosina Buecher’s house on January 17, 1797, was transferred to the church; the church was then called Maria Absam Sanctuary.

On June 24, 2000, the day of St. John the Baptist and the village's second patron saint, the church was proclaimed a Basilica, although there had been no petition for such a change by the community. It thus became the first sanctuary without a monastery in Tyrol to get this designation.

== Notable people ==
- Josef Feistmantl (born 1939): luger
- Franz Fischler (born 1946): politician
- Jacob Stainer: (born 1619): luthier
- Max Weiler (born 1910): painter

== Economy ==
=== Industries ===
Absam is home to the Swarovski Optik KG founded in 1935 by Wilhelm Swarovski; having developed a process of smoothing lenses and prisms, he applied it to the production of binoculars. The first serial product, "Habicht 7 x 42" is still in production and used mainly in the hunting optics. Swarovski Optik also manufactures telescopes, rifle scopes, optronic instruments, range finders and image intensifier tubes.
