= Edmund von Wörndle =

Austrian painter (1827–1906)

Edmund von Wörndle zu Adelsfried und Weiherburg
- Born: 28 July 1827; Vienna, Austrian Empire
- Died: 3 August 1906 (aged 79); Innsbruck, Austria-Hungary
- Known for: Painting
- Style: Landscapes
- Movement: Romanticism

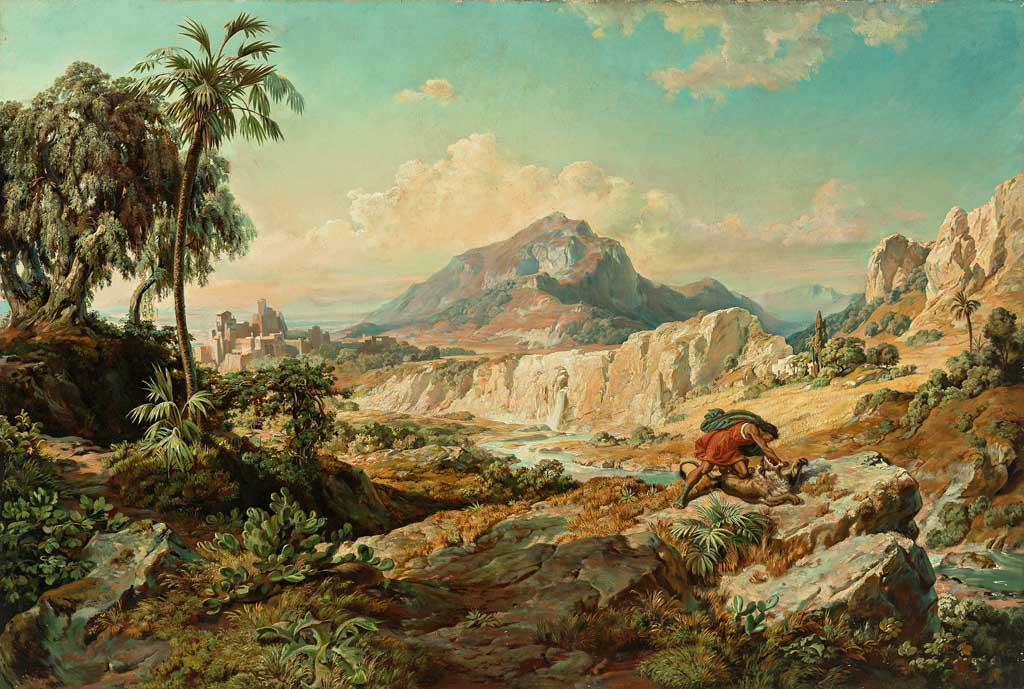
Samson and the Lion

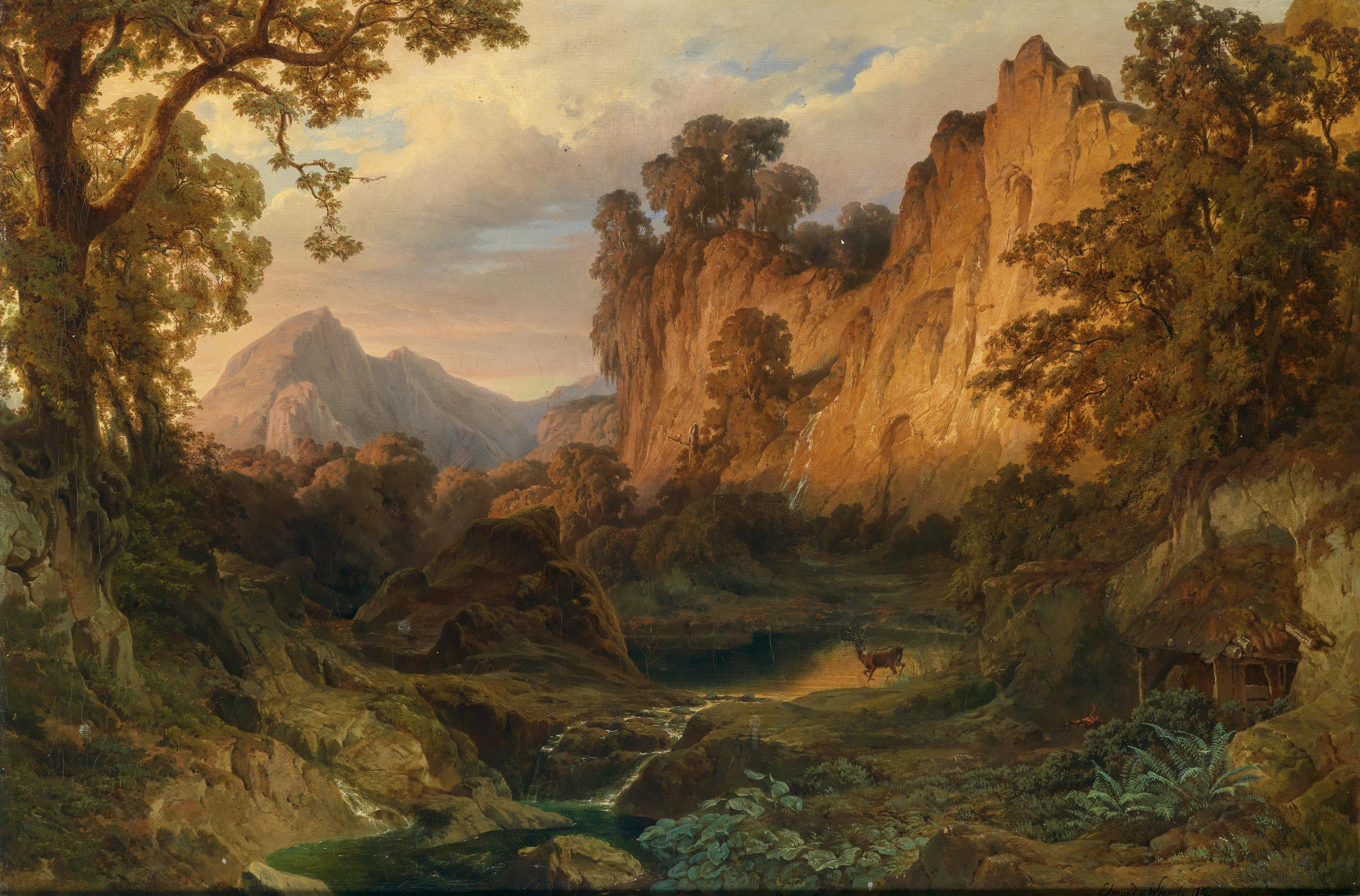
Romantic Landscape in Evening Light

Edmund von Wörndle zu Adelsfried und Weiherburg (28 July 1827 – 3 August 1906) was an Austrian landscape painter, in the Romantic style.

== Life and work ==
He was born into the Wörndle family, as a son of Johann von Wörndle, Building Manager at the Hofburg (Imperial Palace). His grandfather, Philip von Wörndle (1755–1818), was a Commander in the Landsturm. His brother, August von Wörndle, also became a painter.

He and his brother both attended the Academy of Fine Arts, Vienna, where he studied landscape painting with Franz Steinfeld and Thomas Ender. In 1855, he set out on a pilgrimage to Palestine; making several books of sketches. These were later made into oil paintings and lithographs; published in Vienna and Innsbruck.

From 1856 to 1859, he lived in the Austrian Embassy, at the Palazzo Venezia in Rome. While there, he received commissions from throughout Europe. He then returned to Innsbruck, to live with his family. Shortly after, he married Sophie von Attlmeier.

From 1880 to 1883, he created scenes based on the epic medieval poem, Parzival by Wolfram von Eschenbach. They were first exhibited In Merano. In 1896, together with his son Wilhelm, who was also an artist, he created eleven historical scenes from the life of Andreas Hofer, for the Sacred Heart memorial chapel at the church in St. Leonhard in Passeier. They were his last major work. He was a founder of the "Association for Church Arts and Crafts" and served on its board until 1905.

His eldest son, Heinrich, was an author, publisher and bookseller.

== Sources ==
- Constantin von Wurzbach: "Wörndle von Adelsfried, Edmund." In: Biographisches Lexikon des Kaiserthums Oesterreich (Biographical Lexicon of the Empire of Austria). Part 57 Kaiserlich-königliche Hof- und Staatsdruckerei, Vienna 1889, p. 222–224 (digitalised).
- Monika Oberhammer: Der Landschaftsmaler Edmund von Wörndle zu Adelsfried (1827–1906). Dissertation. University of Innsbruck, 1969.
