= Peter Gorsen =

Austrian art historian (1933–2017)

Peter Gorsen (16 November 1933 Danzig – 8 November 2017 Vienna) was an Austrian art historian.

Gorsen studied under Theodor W. Adorno and Jürgen Habermas at the University of Frankfurt, and gained his doctorate, Zur Phänomenologie des Bewußtseinsstroms. Bergson, Dilthey, Husserl, Simmel und die lebensphilosophischen Antinomien which was published in 1966.

== Works ==
- 1966: Zur Phänomenologie des Bewußtseinsstroms. Bergson, Dilthey, Husserl, Simmel und die lebensphilosophischen Antinomien, Bonn: Bouvier
