= Gnadenwald =

- Municipality
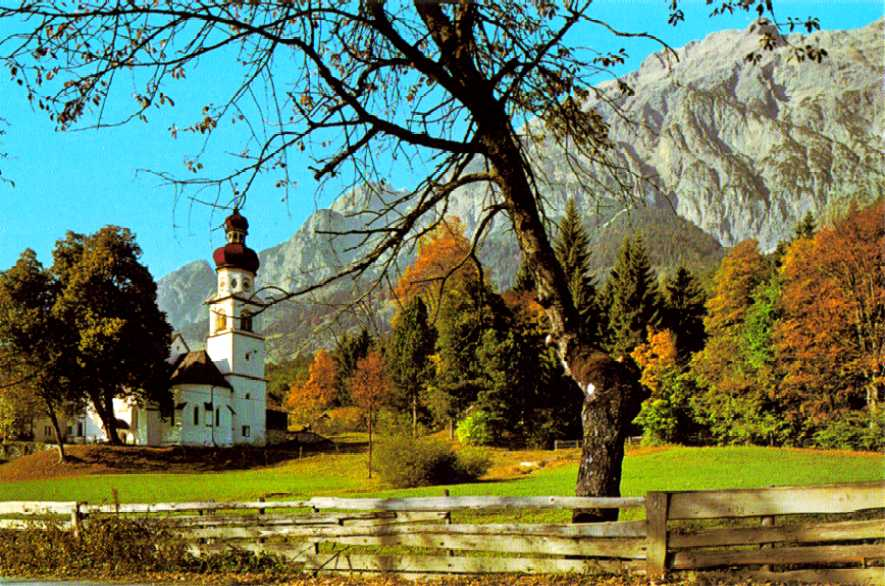

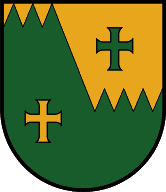
- Coat of arms

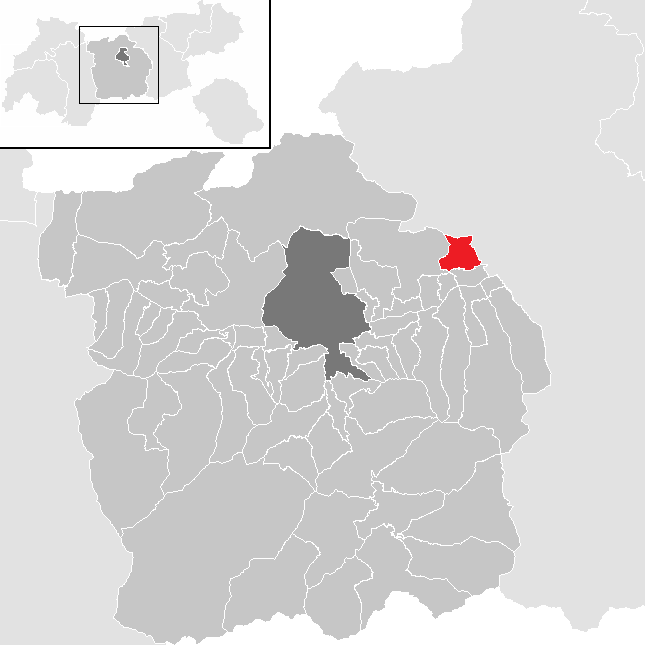
- Location in the district

- Location within Austria
- Coordinates: 47°19′20″N 11°34′37″E
- Country: Austria
- State: Tyrol
- District: Innsbruck Land

Government
  - Mayor: Günter Strasser (Gemeinschaftsliste Gnadenwald)

Area
  - Total: 11.5 km^{2} (4.4 sq mi)
- Elevation: 879 m (2,884 ft)

Population (2021)
  - Total: 826
  - Density: 71.8/km^{2} (186/sq mi)
- Time zone: UTC+1 (CET)
  - Summer (DST): UTC+2 (CEST)
- Postal code: 6069
- Area code: 05223
- Vehicle registration: IL
- Website: www.gnadenwald.tirol.gv.at

Gnadenwald is a municipality in the eastern part of the district Innsbruck country. The village consists of several hamlets and the church villages: St. Martin and St. Michael.

== Population ==
Historical population
Year	Pop.	±%
1869	301	—
1880	288	−4.3%
1890	282	−2.1%
1900	266	−5.7%
1910	266	+0.0%
1923	284	+6.8%
1934	273	−3.9%
1939	258	−5.5%
1951	359	+39.1%
1961	309	−13.9%
1971	350	+13.3%
1981	409	+16.9%
1991	551	+34.7%
2001	605	+9.8%
2011	713	+17.9%
2015	772	+8.3%

== Personalities ==
Gnadenwald was the birthplace of the Tyrolean nationalist leader and rebel Josef Speckbacher
