= Josef Deckert =

Austrian anti-Semitic agitator (1843–1901)

Josef Deckert (17 November 1843 in Drösing, Lower Austria – 23 March 1901), also known as Francis, was an Austrian Catholic priest and antisemitic agitator. Deckert was a propagandist of the blood libel against the Jews.

From the 1870s Deckert was identified with the Austrian antisemitic movement. He did not become prominent until the liberal press exposed some of his questionable business transactions. In retaliation he published a pamphlet on Simon of Trent, in an effort to confirm the truth of the blood accusation (Ein Ritualmord Actenmässig Nachgewiesen, Vienna 1893). Actuated by the same motive, he induced the convert Paulus Meyer to write an account of a ritual murder which he pretended to have seen in 1875 in Ostrov, Russia. The story was published in the Vienna Vaterland, and the parties named as perpetrators in the crime brought a libel suit against Meyer and Deckert, the latter being sentenced (Sept. 15, 1893) to a fine of 400 florins ($160).

Deckert continued to preach anti-Jewish sermons, which he published in his magazine, Der Sendbote des Heiligen Joseph. To one of these sermons he appended a "prayer for the distress caused by the Jews" (1894), a travesty of the "Lord's prayer" in the most infamous language. The government confiscated it. His violent diatribes were several times the object of an interpellation in the Reichsrat, and evoked from the premier, Prince Windischgrätz, the reply (May 27, 1895) that he regretted such expressions were heard from a Christian pulpit. Nevertheless, the lawsuit brought against Deckert for inciting riots was dismissed (Jan. 14, 1896). He continued his tirades with a collection of sermons under the title Juden 'raus! (Out with the Jews), published in the same year. He became popular with the antisemitic city government, and in 1899 was given the Salvator gold medal, the highest distinction in the gift of the city. He, however, bequeathed in his will a sum for charity to be distributed without regard to religious distinctions. He died in Vienna on March 21, 1901.

== Jewish Encyclopedia bibliography ==
- Mittheilungen aus dem Vereine zur Abwehr des Antisemitismus;
- Oesterreichische Wochenschrift, passim;
- Neue Freie Presse, March 23, 1901.
