= Tulfes =

- Municipality
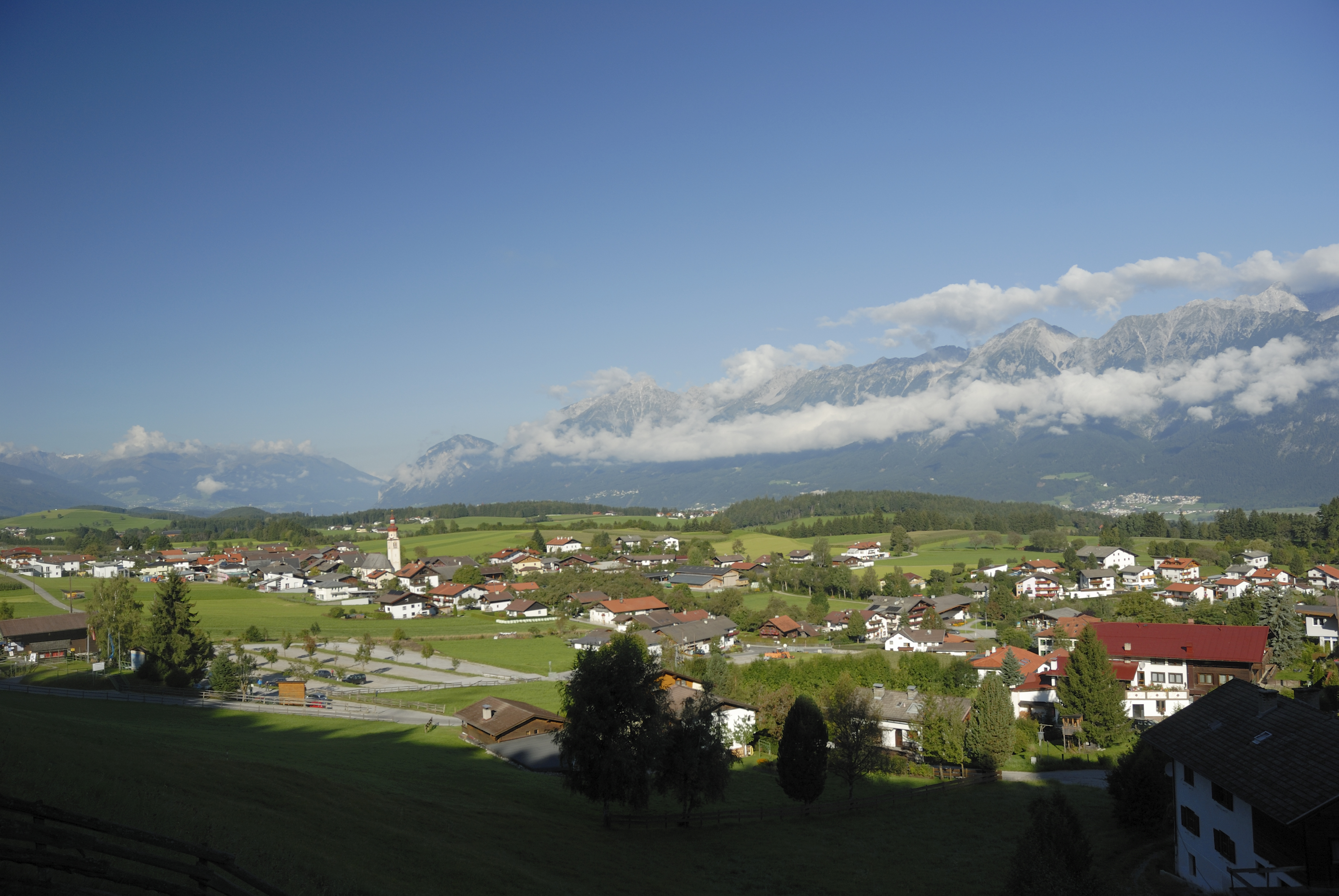
- View of Tulfes

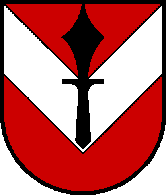
- Coat of arms

- Location within Austria
- Coordinates: 47°15′25″N 11°31′49″E
- Country: Austria
- State: Tyrol
- District: Innsbruck Land

Government
  - Mayor: Martin Wegscheider

Area
  - Total: 27.71 km^{2} (10.70 sq mi)
- Elevation: 923 m (3,028 ft)

Population (2020)
  - Total: 1,642
  - Density: 59.26/km^{2} (153.5/sq mi)
- Time zone: UTC+1 (CET)
  - Summer (DST): UTC+2 (CEST)
- Postal code: 6075
- Area code: 05223
- Vehicle registration: IL
- Website: www.tulfes.gv.at

Tulfes is a municipality in the district of Innsbruck-Land in the Austrian state of Tyrol, located 12 km east of Innsbruck and 6 km above Hall in Tirol. The village was mentioned as “Tellevo” for the first time in 1240. Main source of income is tourism. Tulfes became a popular area of settlement due to the cities of Innsbruck and Hall.

== Population ==
Historical population
Year	Pop.	±%
1869	474	—
1880	518	+9.3%
1890	506	−2.3%
1900	500	−1.2%
1910	507	+1.4%
1923	545	+7.5%
1934	561	+2.9%
1939	541	−3.6%
1951	663	+22.6%
1961	640	−3.5%
1971	746	+16.6%
1981	968	+29.8%
1991	1,113	+15.0%
2001	1,302	+17.0%
2011	1,393	+7.0%
