= Max Weiler (artist) =

Austrian painter (1910–2001)

Max Weiler (born 27 August 1910 in Absam, Austria; died 29 January 2001 in Vienna) was an Austrian painter.

A substantial account of Weiler’s life and art has been prepared by Univ-Prof. Dr. Gottfried Boehm, Univ-Prof. Dr. Wieland Schmied, and Univ-Prof. Dr. Thomas Zaunschirm.

== Honours and awards ==
- Represents Austria at the XXX Venice Biennale (1960)
- Grand Austrian State Prize for Fine Arts (1960)
- Medal of Tyrol (1970)
- Austrian Decoration for Science and Art (1979)
- Ring of Honour of Hall in Tirol (1987)
- Tyrolean State Prize for Art (1987)
- Honorary Medal of the Austrian capital Vienna in Gold (1987)
- Grand Silver Medal with Star for Services to the Republic of Austria (1995)
- Honorary citizen of Vienna (2000)
- Grand Gold Medal with Star for Services to the Republic of Austria (2000)
