= Volders =

- Municipality
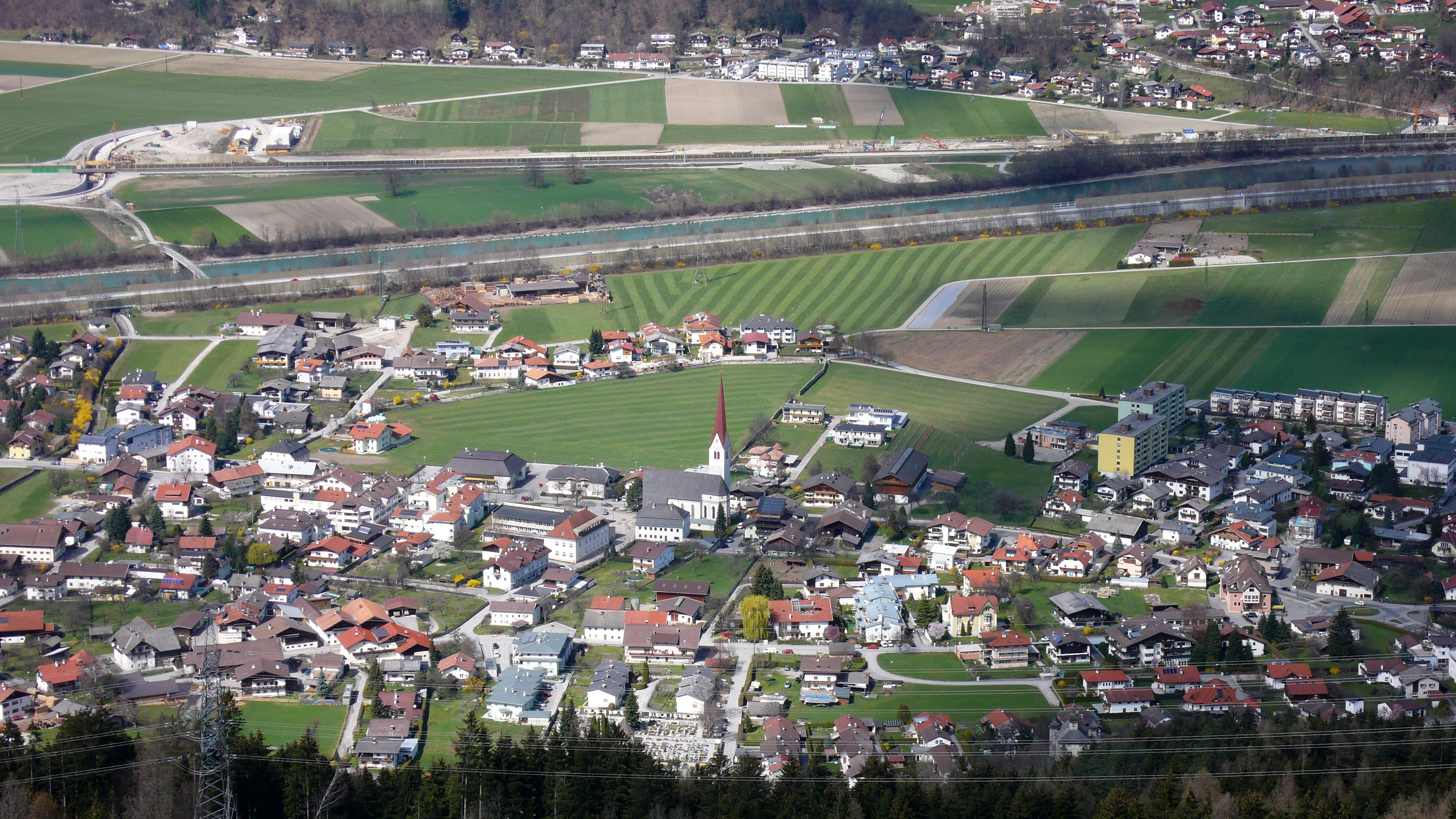

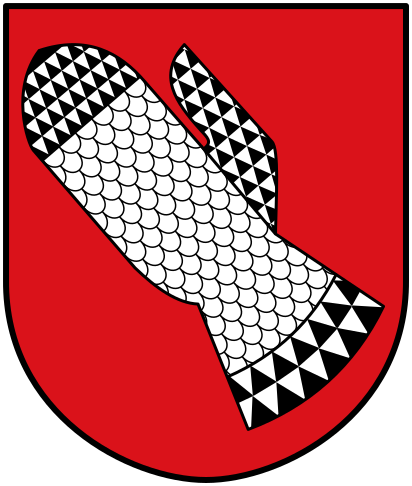
- Coat of arms

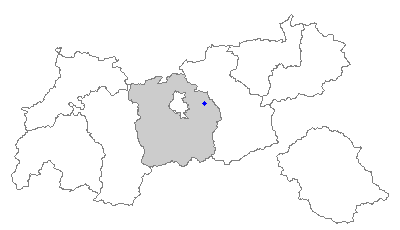
- Location of Volders within Tyrol

- Location within Austria
- Coordinates: 47°17′15″N 11°33′55″E
- Country: Austria
- State: Tyrol
- District: Innsbruck Land

Government
  - Mayor: Peter Schwemberger

Area
  - Total: 32.42 km^{2} (12.52 sq mi)
- Elevation: 558 m (1,831 ft)

Population (2020)
  - Total: 4,451
  - Density: 137.3/km^{2} (355.6/sq mi)
- Time zone: UTC+1 (CET)
  - Summer (DST): UTC+2 (CEST)
- Postal code: 6111
- Area code: 05224
- Vehicle registration: IL
- Website: www.volders.tirol.gv.at

Volders is a municipality in the district of Innsbruck-Land in the Austrian state of Tyrol located 12 km east of Innsbruck on the southern side of the Inn River.

== Geography ==
Sights are Schloss Friedberg and Schloss Aschach and the church of Saint Charles Borromeo, attached to a Servite convent.

Next to the church at the entrance of the village lies the Volderer See, a small lake which has shrunk significantly and now resembles a pond. It has no natural inflow or outflow, and receives water primarily from rain, and also the groundwater of the Inn River. The water quality is moderate, varying between grades B and C, and is often plagued by algae. There is a local legend that a giant blocked the inflow to the lake with a large boulder, causing it to shrink.

== Population ==
Historical population
Year	Pop.	±%
1869	846	—
1880	883	+4.4%
1890	921	+4.3%
1900	1,024	+11.2%
1910	1,341	+31.0%
1923	1,212	−9.6%
1934	1,307	+7.8%
1939	1,276	−2.4%
1951	1,710	+34.0%
1961	1,960	+14.6%
1971	2,446	+24.8%
1981	2,822	+15.4%
1991	3,549	+25.8%
2001	4,166	+17.4%
2011	4,330	+3.9%

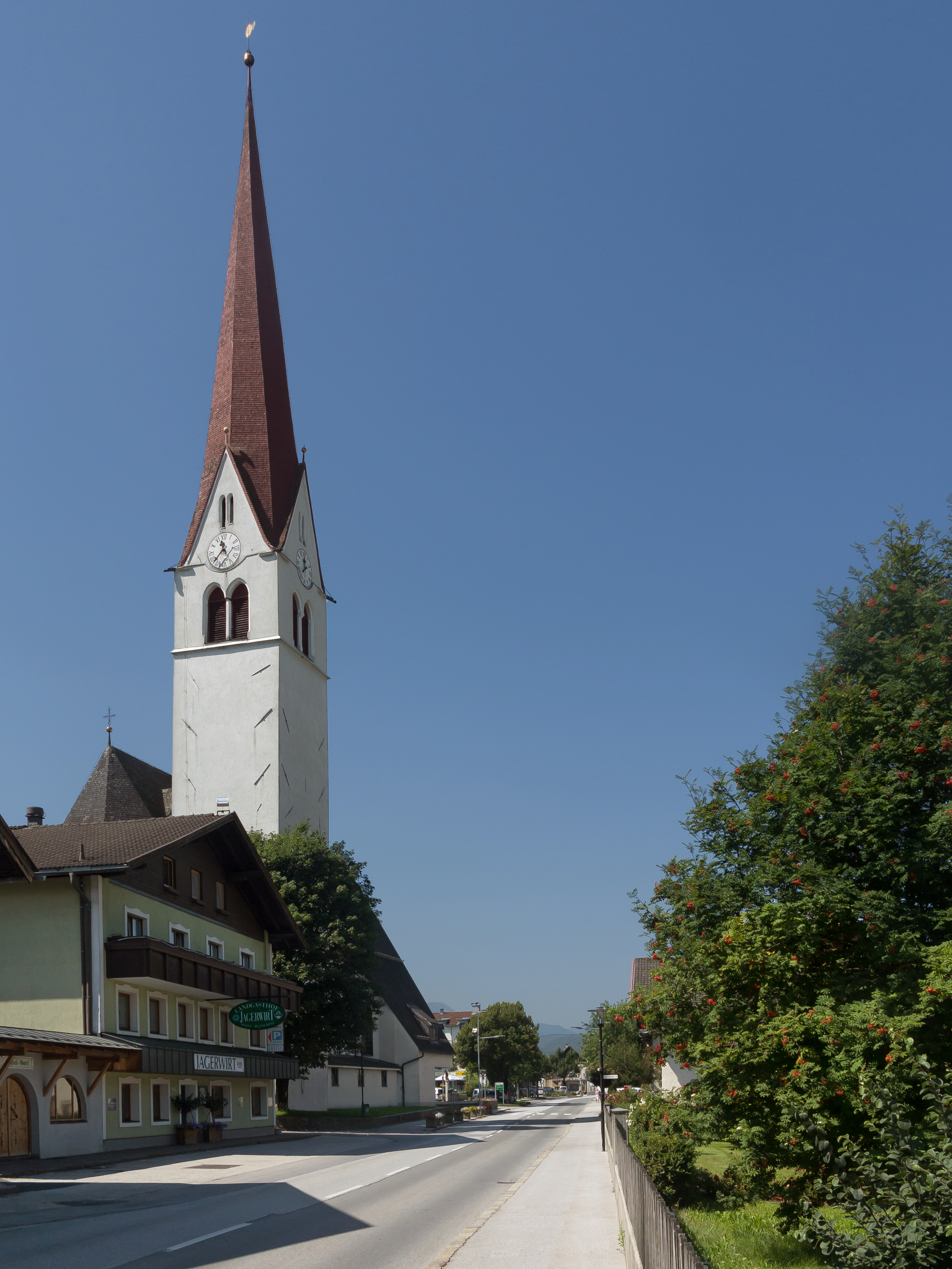
Parish church of Saint John the Baptist
