= August von Wörndle =

Austrian painter

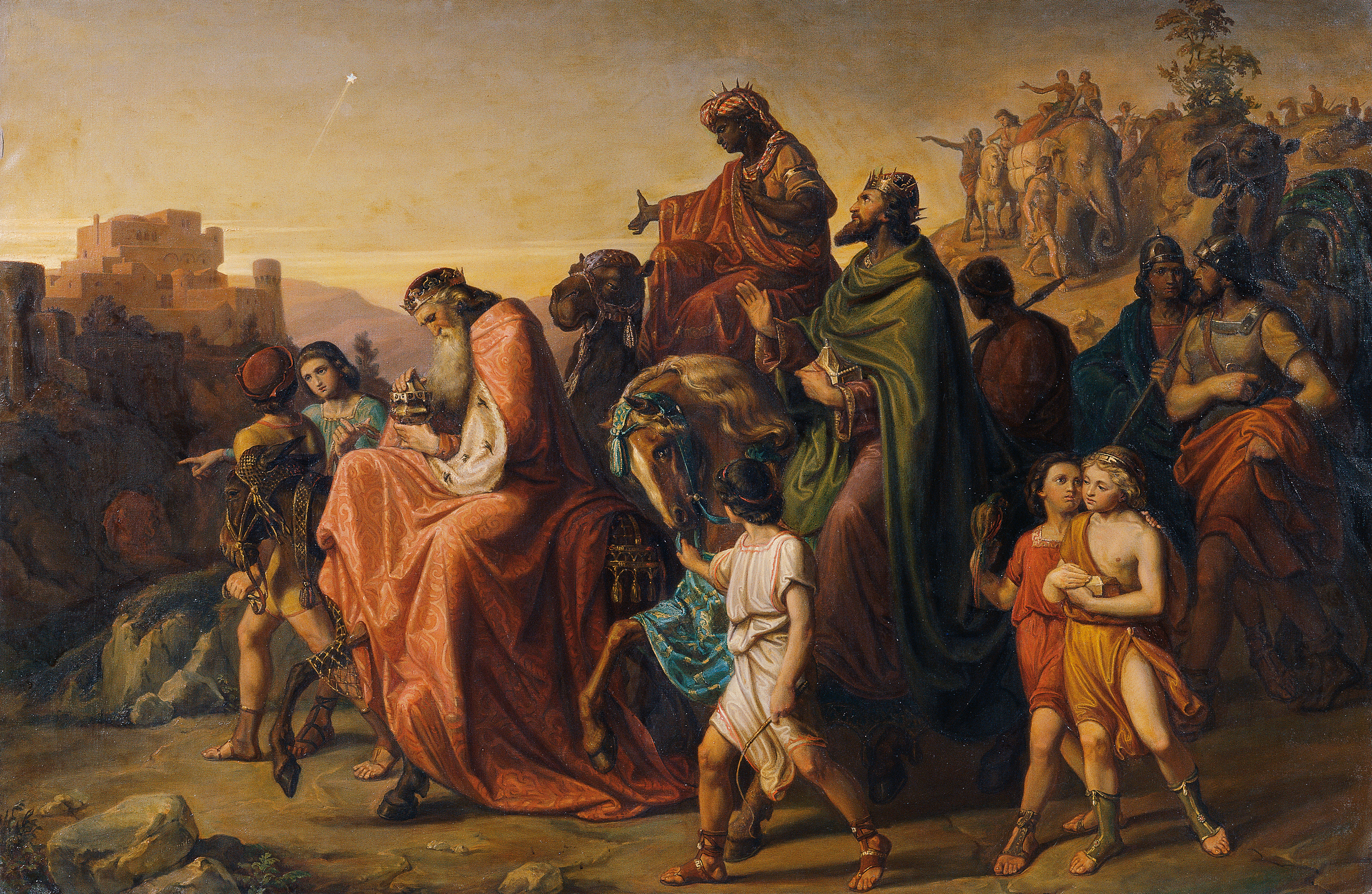
Journey of the Three Wise Men

August Wörndle von Adelsfried (22 June 1829, Vienna - 26 April 1902, Vienna) was an Austrian history painter.

== Life and work ==
He was born to Johann von Wörndle, Building Manager at the Hofburg (Imperial Palace). His brother, Edmund von Wörndle, also became a painter.

From 1844, he studied at the Academy of Fine Arts, Vienna. Under the influence of one of his instructors, Joseph von Führich, he became an admirer of the Nazarene movement. In 1853, he went to Rome on an Imperial scholarship and remained there until 1859. As an employee of Peter von Cornelius, he was involved in the creation of kartons for the "Campo Santo", a burial plot at the home of King Friedrich Wilhelm IV in Berlin.

In 1868, he settled in Vienna. He married Fürich's daughter, Anna, in 1872. They had a son, who died in childhood, and a daughter, Paula, who became a nun ("Mother Felicitas") in the Order of St. Ursula. Later, he served as a tutor to the Archdukes, Otto and Franz Ferdinand.

His most notable works include the frescoes in the chapel at Ambras Castle, and at the parish church of St. Laurentius in Wörgl.

== Sources ==
- Constantin von Wurzbach: "Wörndle von Adelsfried, August." In: Biographisches Lexikon des Kaiserthums Oesterreich (Biographical Lexicon of the Empire of Austria). Part 57 Kaiserlich-königliche Hof- und Staatsdruckerei, Vienna 1889, p. 221 f. (digitalised).
- "Wörndle von Adelsfried, August". In: Hans Vollmer (Ed.): Allgemeines Lexikon der Bildenden Künstler von der Antike bis zur Gegenwart, Vol.36: Wilhelmy–Zyzywi. E. A. Seemann, Leipzig 1947, pg.170
