= Rinn =

Place in Tyrol, Austria

- Municipality
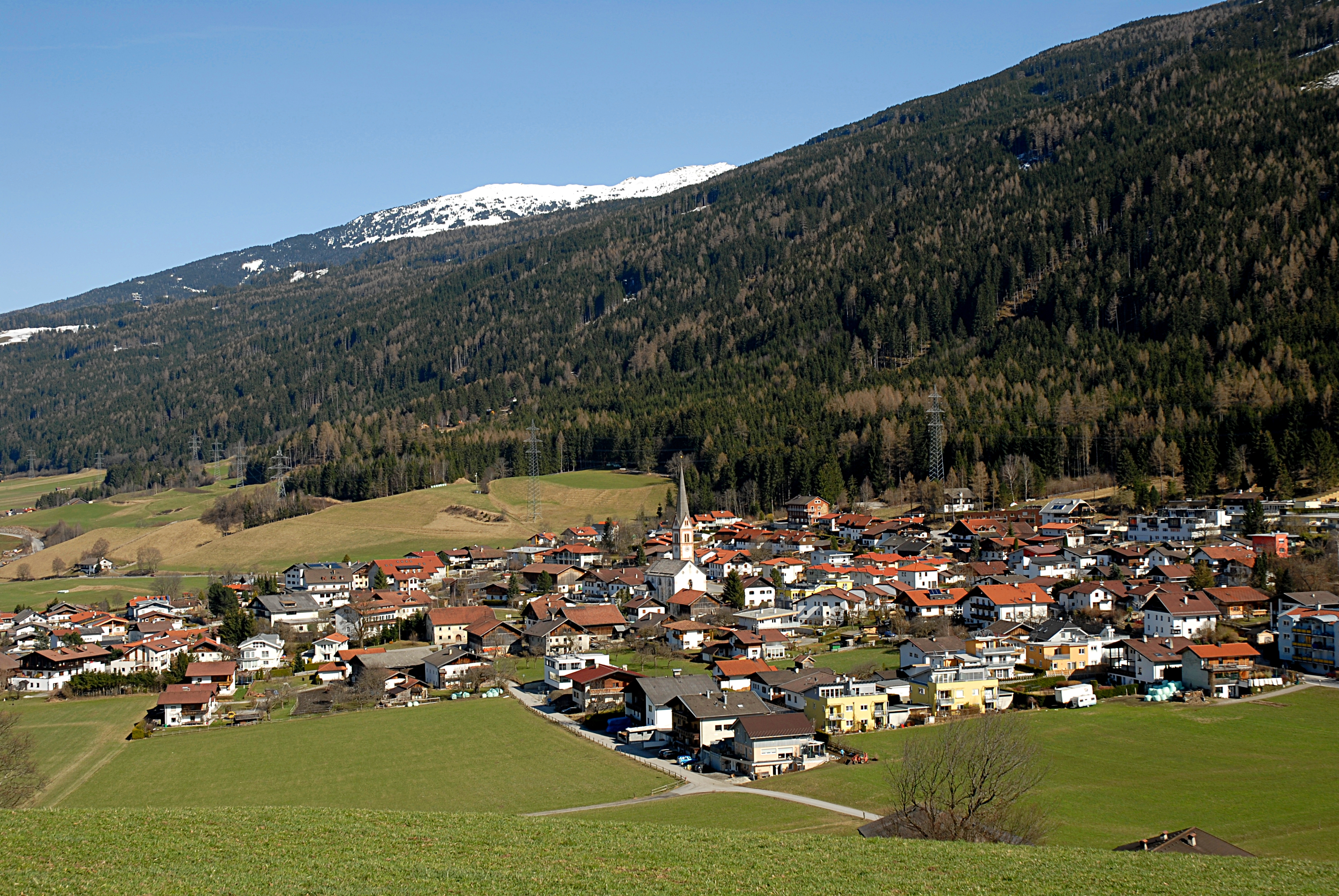

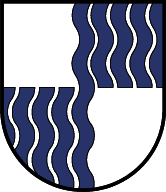
- Coat of arms

- Location within Austria
- Coordinates: 47°14′58″N 11°30′13″E
- Country: Austria
- State: Tyrol
- District: Innsbruck Land

Government
  - Mayor: Herbert Schafferer

Area
  - Total: 10.65 km^{2} (4.11 sq mi)
- Elevation: 918 m (3,012 ft)

Population (2020)
  - Total: 1,939
  - Density: 182.1/km^{2} (471.5/sq mi)
- Time zone: UTC+1 (CET)
  - Summer (DST): UTC+2 (CEST)
- Postal code: 6074
- Area code: 05223
- Vehicle registration: IL
- Website: www.rinn.gv.at

Rinn is a municipality in the Innsbruck-Land district of the Austrian state of Tyrol, located 6 km southeast of Innsbruck. The village was first mentioned in documents as “Runne” in 1250.

== Population ==
Historical population
Year	Pop.	±%
1869	321	—
1880	313	−2.5%
1890	312	−0.3%
1900	358	+14.7%
1910	386	+7.8%
1923	469	+21.5%
1934	470	+0.2%
1939	432	−8.1%
1951	598	+38.4%
1961	611	+2.2%
1971	682	+11.6%
1981	937	+37.4%
1991	1,142	+21.9%
2001	1,430	+25.2%
2011	1,655	+15.7%

== Climate ==
Climate type is dominated by a long, cold winter season with short, clear days, relatively little precipitation mainly in the form of snow, and low humidity. The Köppen Climate Classification subtype for this climate is "Dfb" (humid continental climate).

Climate data for Rinn (1971–2000)
Month	Jan	Feb	Mar	Apr	May	Jun	Jul	Aug	Sep	Oct	Nov	Dec	Year
Record high °C (°F)	16.2 (61.2)	17.0 (62.6)	21.1 (70.0)	24.5 (76.1)	28.0 (82.4)	30.5 (86.9)	33.5 (92.3)	32.0 (89.6)	30.5 (86.9)	23.1 (73.6)	19.0 (66.2)	16.2 (61.2)	33.5 (92.3)
Mean daily maximum °C (°F)	2.2 (36.0)	3.9 (39.0)	8.1 (46.6)	11.7 (53.1)	17.1 (62.8)	19.5 (67.1)	21.7 (71.1)	21.3 (70.3)	17.8 (64.0)	13.1 (55.6)	5.9 (42.6)	2.5 (36.5)	12.1 (53.8)
Daily mean °C (°F)	−2.1 (28.2)	−1.2 (29.8)	2.4 (36.3)	5.9 (42.6)	11.1 (52.0)	13.6 (56.5)	15.7 (60.3)	15.1 (59.2)	11.6 (52.9)	7.3 (45.1)	1.5 (34.7)	−1.5 (29.3)	6.6 (43.9)
Mean daily minimum °C (°F)	−5.4 (22.3)	−4.6 (23.7)	−1.5 (29.3)	1.4 (34.5)	5.8 (42.4)	8.4 (47.1)	10.4 (50.7)	10.3 (50.5)	7.4 (45.3)	3.6 (38.5)	−1.5 (29.3)	−4.5 (23.9)	2.5 (36.5)
Record low °C (°F)	−24.0 (−11.2)	−18.0 (−0.4)	−19.4 (−2.9)	−7.4 (18.7)	−5.5 (22.1)	0.2 (32.4)	1.6 (34.9)	1.0 (33.8)	−2.7 (27.1)	−8.0 (17.6)	−16.3 (2.7)	−21.0 (−5.8)	−24.0 (−11.2)
Average precipitation mm (inches)	31.1 (1.22)	31.0 (1.22)	48.4 (1.91)	56.8 (2.24)	82.0 (3.23)	113.4 (4.46)	128.0 (5.04)	110.1 (4.33)	79.9 (3.15)	53.2 (2.09)	52.9 (2.08)	42.9 (1.69)	829.7 (32.67)
Average snowfall cm (inches)	18.6 (7.3)	20.3 (8.0)	17.9 (7.0)	9.7 (3.8)	1.5 (0.6)	0.0 (0.0)	0.0 (0.0)	0.0 (0.0)	0.0 (0.0)	1.4 (0.6)	14.8 (5.8)	20.3 (8.0)	104.5 (41.1)
Average precipitation days (≥ 1.0 mm)	6.4	5.9	8.0	9.0	10.1	13.3	12.9	12.6	8.4	7.0	7.8	7.8	109.2
Average relative humidity (%) (at 14:00)	66.1	60.4	54.2	50.7	50.3	54.4	55.6	57.2	57.9	60.6	70.9	73.2	59.3
Mean monthly sunshine hours	70.2	110.2	151.7	164.7	203.6	191.0	228.9	219.0	183.9	153.0	83.6	51.1	1,810.9
Percentage possible sunshine	44.4	54.0	48.5	45.0	49.2	44.6	54.0	55.2	56.5	56.6	47.2	44.1	49.9
Source: Central Institute for Meteorology and Geodynamics
