= Werner of Oberwesel =

German saint (1271–1287)

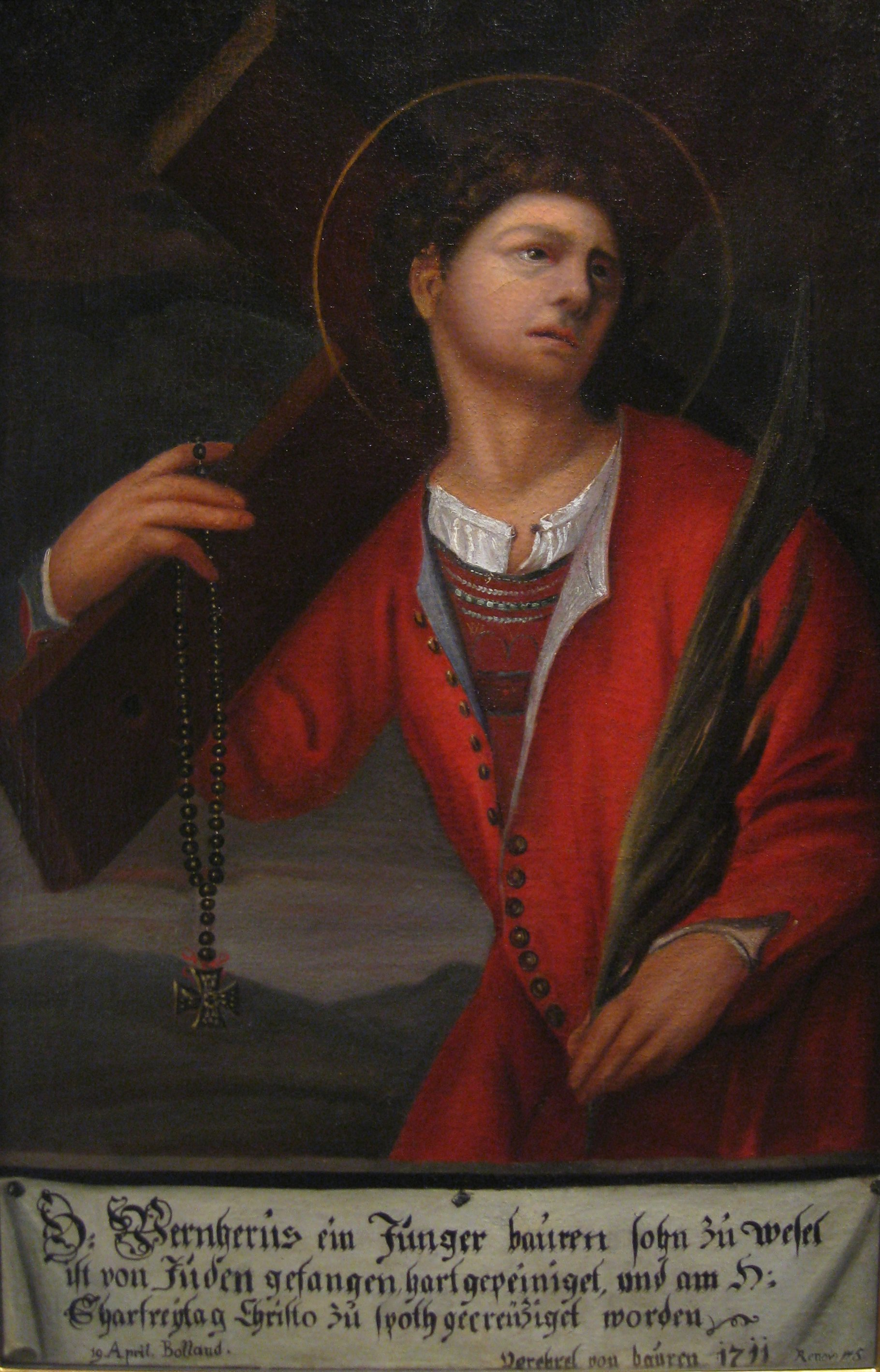
- Painting of Werner in the Jewish Museum, Berlin.
- Born: 1271; Womrath, Hunsrück
- Died: 1287; Womrath, Hunsrück
- Venerated in: Roman Catholic Church (Diocese of Trier)
- Feast: April 19
- Attributes: sickle, shovel, pan
- Patronage: Winemakers
- Controversy: Blood libel
- Catholic cult suppressed: 1963

Werner of Oberwesel (also known as Werner of Bacharach or Werner of Womrath; 1271 – 1287) was a 16-year-old boy whose unexplained death was blamed on Jews (it is an example of a medieval blood libel), leading to revenge killings of Jews across Europe. Considered a folk saint, he received official veneration in the Diocese of Trier and was regarded as a martyr despite never being formally canonized.

Saint Werner's Chapel in Oberwesel on the Rhine was established in 1289 and became a popular pilgrimage site. His veneration prompted other allegations against Jews, such as Host desecration and ritual murder. The Diocese of Trier ceased veneration of Werner in 1963, and his cult was suppressed.

== Background ==
Born in 1271 in Womrath, Hunsrück, Werner came from a poor background. On Maundy Thursday 1287, his body was found near Bacharach. Certain Christians blamed his murder on the Jews, claiming that they had used his blood for the Jewish ritual of Passover (the blood libel against Jews). Similar anti-Jewish legends were widely circulated in the Middle Ages.

The alleged murder was followed by a wave of pogroms against the Jewish community. Violence spread from the Middle Rhine to the Moselle and the Lower Rhine region. The Jewish community turned to King Rudolf I, who was convinced the accusations were groundless. He fined the murderers of Jews and ordered the burning of the corpse of Werner to prevent any further veneration.

== Veneration ==
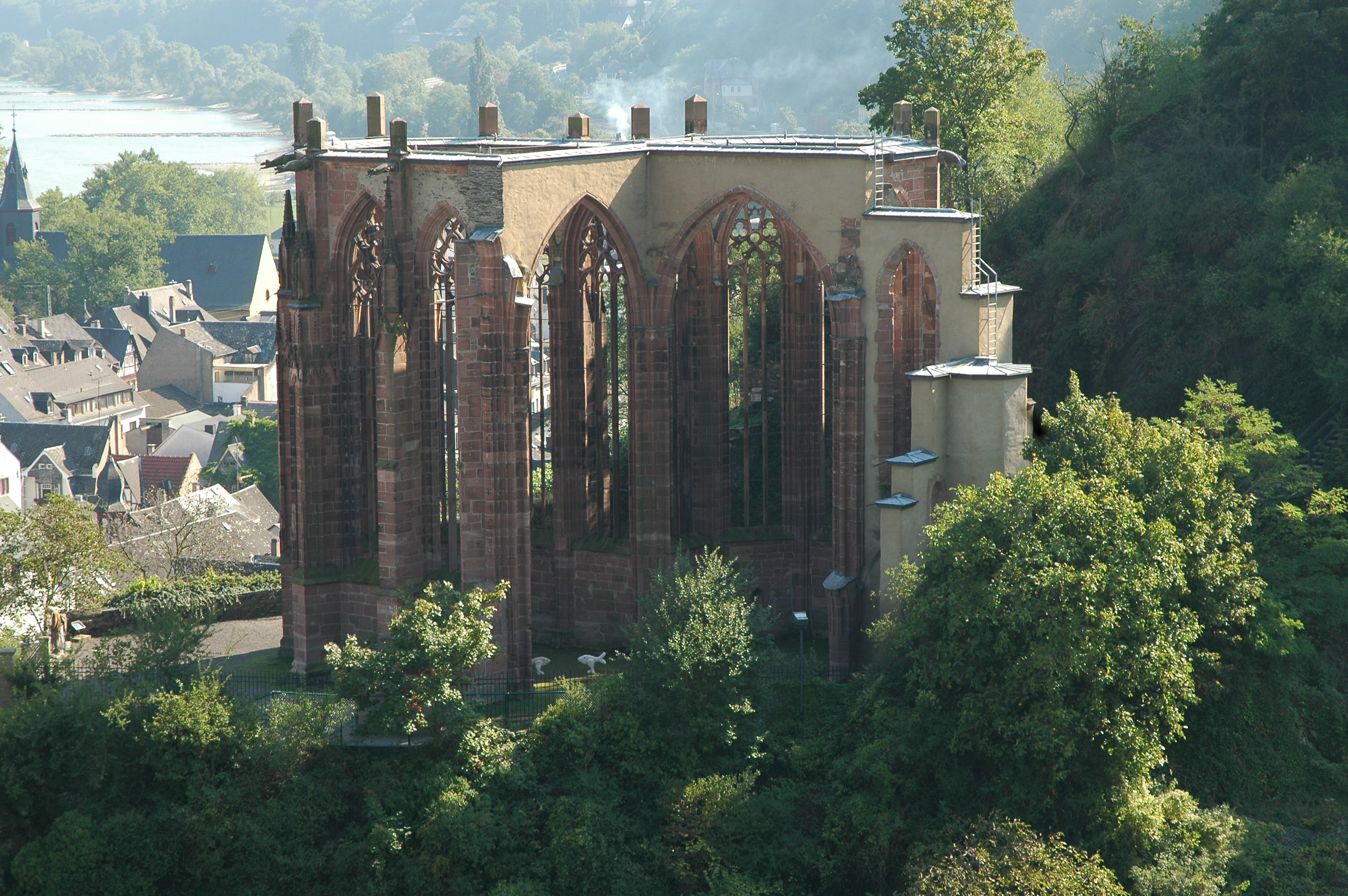
Saint Werner's Chapel, Bacharach, from 1289

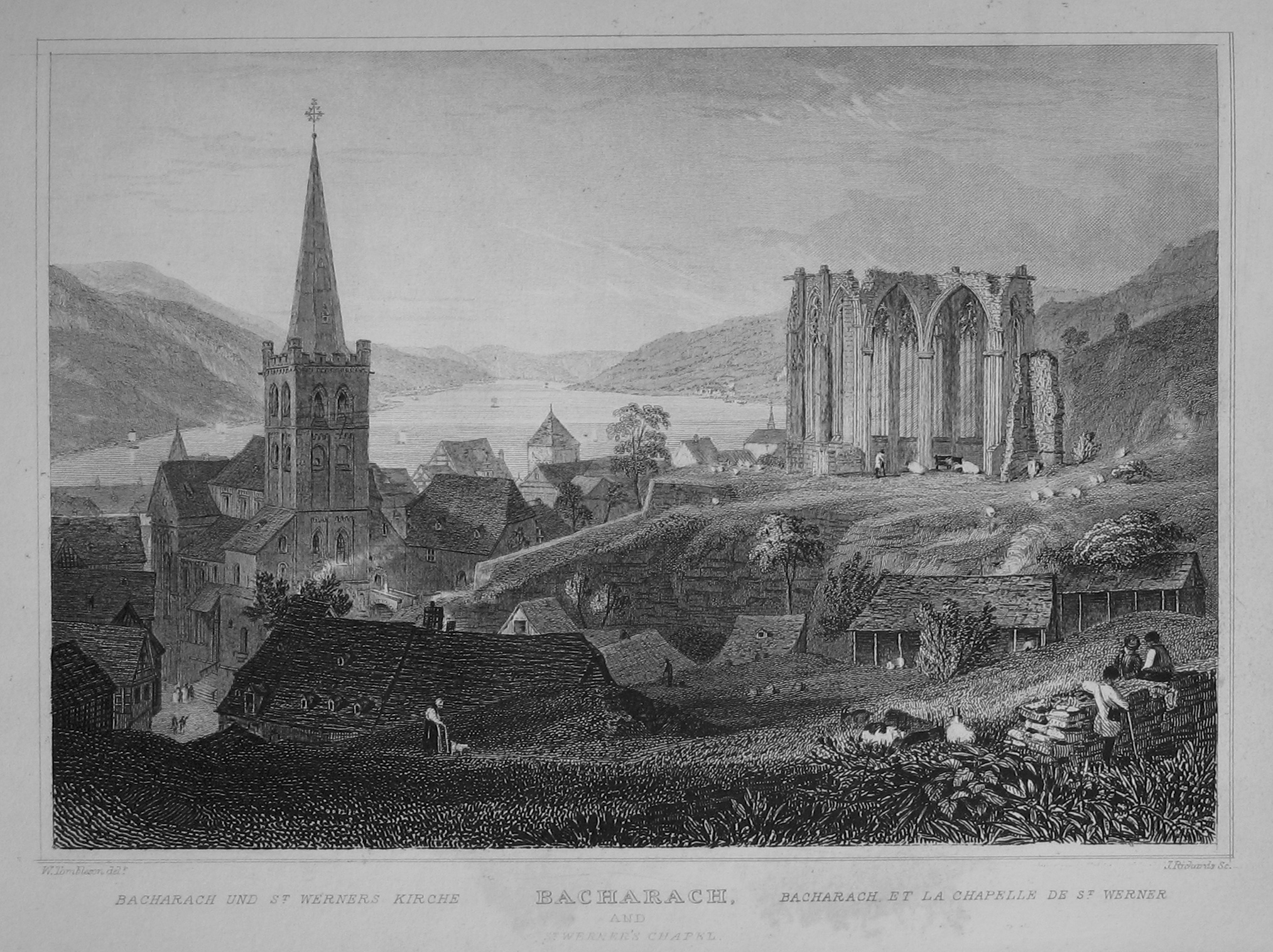
"Views of the Rhine" by William Tombleson (1840), ruins of Saint Werner's Chapel, Bacharach (Rhine romanticism).

The royal instructions to burn Werner's body, to prevent any further veneration, were not followed. Werner was buried on 30 April 1287 and alleged miracles began to be reported as the veneration spread as a martyr cult. The Cunibert Chapel in Bacharach was expanded beginning in 1289 to become the present Saint Werner's Chapel. The planned expansion of the chapel into a large church remained unfinished after 1338. A further construction also failed owing to the decline of the veneration of martyrs and shrinking revenue to the church from pilgrims.

The 1338 Latin legend alleges the Jews hung Werner by his feet. Then they had him thrown into the Rhine. At the point in Bacharach where the body was supposedly washed ashore, Saint Werner's Chapel was built. A second sanctuary was built in the Chapel of the Holy Spirit Hospital of Oberwesel, 7 kilometers downstream.

Count Palatine Ludwig III aspired to a revival of the cult. Attempts towards canonization were made 1426-1429, and the chapel was finally completed. After 1548 some of the relics were transferred to Besançon, spreading the Werner mythology.

Although the chapel was destroyed in the 17th century, Werner was venerated in the Diocese of Trier until 1963.

In iconography, Werner is depicted with a sickle as well as a shovel and pan. He has been acknowledged as a patron saint of winemakers.

== Contemporary attitudes ==
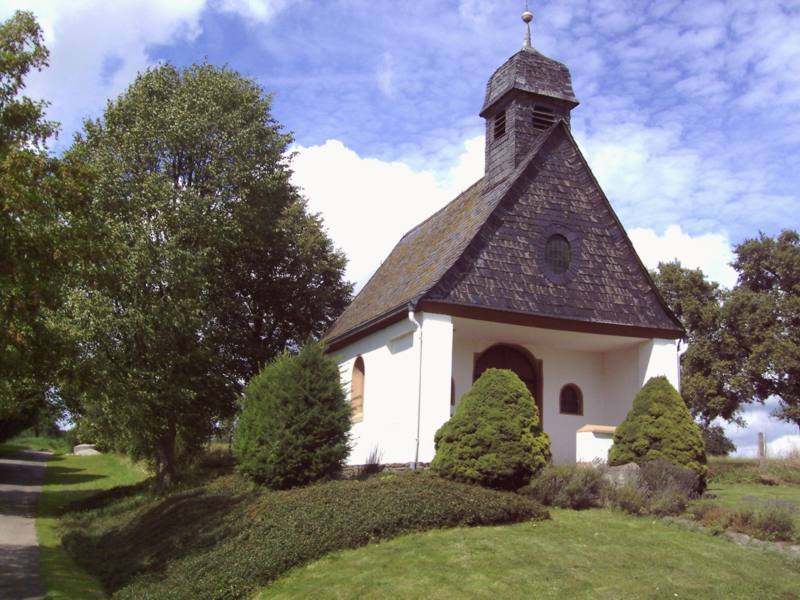
Saint Werner's Chapel, Womrath

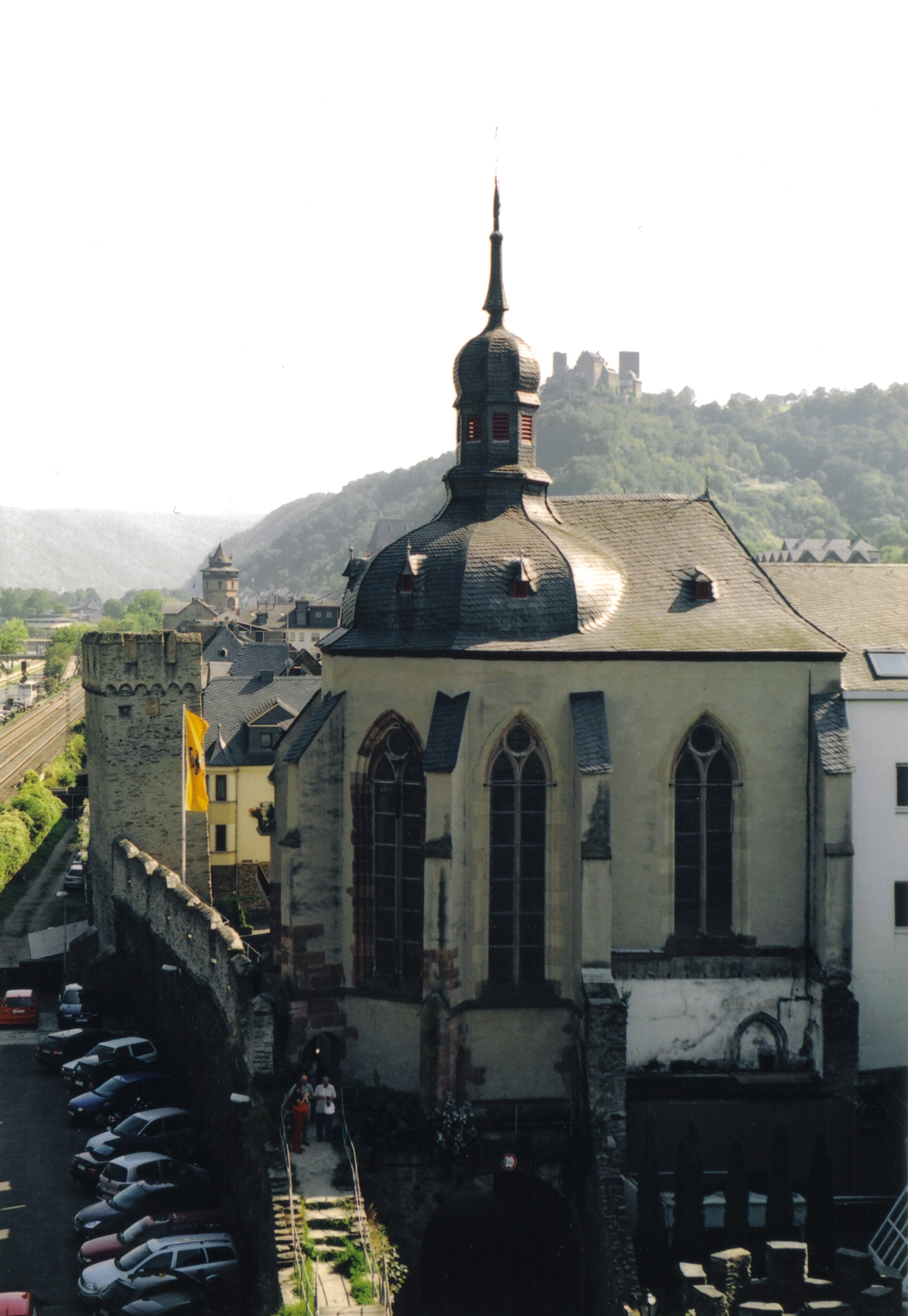
Saint Werner's Chapel, Oberwesel

In 1963, Werner was removed from the calendar of the Diocese of Trier, but "Saint Werner of Oberwesel" still appears in German directories of saints. The chapel dedicated to him alongside the town wall facing the Rhine, which had been in ruins, was later renovated, and a plaque added, with a quotation from Pope John XXIII, recognizing the brotherhood of Christians and Jews, and asking for forgiveness for "the curse that we unrightfully affixed to the Jews’ name."

== See also ==
- Blood Libel
- The Prioress's Tale
- Andreas Oxner
- Saint Gabriel of Białystok
- Harold of Gloucester
- Little Saint Hugh of Lincoln
- Robert of Bury
- Simon of Trent
- William of Norwich
