= St Hugh's School, Woodhall Spa =

Preparatory day and boarding school in Woodhall Spa, Lincolnshire, England

St Hugh's School, Woodhall Spa, Lincolnshire
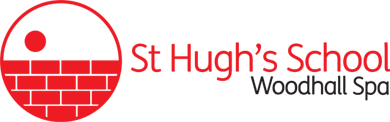
- Logo prior to 2020

Location
- Cromwell Avenue; Woodhall Spa, Lincolnshire, LN10 6TQ; England
- 53.149°N 0.21322°W

Information
- Type: Preparatory day and boarding school
- Motto: Latin: enitendo By striving
- Religious affiliation: Anglican
- Established: 1925
- Founders: Ronnie and Joan Forbes
- Department for Education URN: 120732 Tables
- Chairman of Governors: Ian Tyler
- Headmaster: Jeremy Wyld
- Staff: 43 teaching, 21 support
- Gender: Co-educational
- Age: 2 to 13
- Enrolment: 200
- Capacity: 188
- Houses: Forbes, Kelham, Wheeler
- Colour
- Publication: St Hugh's (annually); The Recorder (weekly)
- Named after: Little Saint Hugh of Lincoln, St Hugh of Lincoln
- Website: www.st-hughs.lincs.sch.uk

St Hugh's School is a coeducational, preparatory school in the village of Woodhall Spa, Lincolnshire, England, founded in 1925. It was originally known as a boarding school, although a significant proportion of its students are now day pupils or flexi-boarders. The headmaster is Jeremy Wyld, who has been in post since September 2019.

== History ==
St Hugh's School was founded by Ronnie and Joan Forbes in 1925, initially in a three-storied house on the corner of Iddesleigh Road and Stanhope Avenue. The school expanded rapidly, spreading into another house which later became the offices of Woodhall Spa UDC. In 1929, the school moved to the present site on Cromwell Avenue, with the buildings being extended and enlarged in 1929 and 1933.

In 1940, when Lincolnshire airfields became a target for the Luftwaffe and the school buildings were commandeered for military use, St Hugh's was evacuated to Storrs Hall in the Lake District, until it was deemed safe to return in 1944.

Fairmead House, a former girls' school, was purchased for use as a senior boys' boarding house in 1946, with the war-time huts in the garden being put to various uses, and in 1952, Austral House, renamed "Dominies", was added as the headmaster's house.

On the death of the founder in 1960, an advisory council was established to govern the school, chaired by Kenneth Riches, Bishop of Lincoln. The school became a charitable trust in 1964 and became co-educational in 1980.

The school is named after Saint Hugh, Bishop of Lincoln but also Little Saint Hugh of Lincoln. Little St Hugh was a child whose alleged murder by Jews in 1255 formed one of the most well-known and persistent anti-semitic blood libels. The Church of England formally apologised for the Little St Hugh allegations in 1955. In some ballads retelling the story, Hugh was playing with a ball, which he lost over the wall of a neighbouring Jewish family, and was murdered after being invited into the garden to retrieve it. Mrs Forbes was familiar with the myth while Mr Forbes asserted that this story should remind his boys to maintain control, both of the ball and where they were allowed to play with it. The story and its moral were represented in the school badge, which showed a ball flying over a wall. In 2020, the school's governing board removed the circle from the logo, retaining the bricks "to reiterate the significance of the educational building blocks".

== Campus ==
The school sits on a 4.7 hectares (11.6 acres) campus on the edge of the village of Woodhall Spa. The original building, an Edwardian villa, has been much extended and the buildings on campus now include a teaching block, a science block, a music school, a library, an assembly hall and a nursery school and pre-prep department. The school has a swimming pool and a sports hall. The cricket pavilion looks over the 3 hectares (7.4 acres) of playing field and the Lincolnshire farmland beyond.

Fairmead House (for senior boys' boarding) and Dominies (the headmaster's house) were sold as part of the restructuring of the school in the 1990s. All senior boarders are now accommodated in the main building and in Raftsund House—an Arts and Crafts villa next door.

== Houses ==
The school uses the house system, with each pupil being placed in a house when they join the school.
The houses are named after three former headmasters; Forbes Kelham and Wheeler.

== Academic ==
Pupils study the usual core subjects of maths, English and the sciences, together with ICT, history, geography, art, cookery, DT, RS and textiles. Language teaching includes French and either Spanish or Latin. Pupils also engage in music, drama and PE and games.

== Sports ==
The main sports for boys are football, cricket and Rugby football.. Older boys also play rugby sevens and hockey. Girls play hockey, netball and rounders. The children also compete in cross country running and athletics. The school has its own swimming pool, and is the regional champion at U9 and U11 level. Other sports available include badminton, basketball, creative dance, gymnastics, handball and orienteering.

== Extra curricular ==
The school has an active music department with two choirs, and an orchestra which often plays full symphony pieces.

In addition to curricular drama lessons, all senior pupils have the chance to participate in a full-length musical production, accompanied by a professional band, in the spring term each year. In addition, there is a range of productions for children in different age groups throughout the school year.

The school operates a forest school in its woodland.

The school runs hobbies sessions at the end of each school day.

== Headmasters ==
- G. R. Forbes 1925—1960
- Mr Vincent 1960–1962
- M. J. C. Wheeler 1962—1972
- M. W. Kelham 1972—1994
- P. Wells 1994—1995
- S. J. Greenish 1997—2013
- C. A. Ward 2013—2019
- J. Wyld 2019—present

== Notable former pupils ==
- Henry Samuel Sharpley (1925—2010); farmer; member of the EEC Cereals Advisory Committee in Brussels; chairman of the NFU Labour committee 1961—1970; High Sheriff of Lincolnshire 1991—1992.
- David Frost (1939—2013); journalist, comedian, writer, media personality and television host.
- John Mallett (born 1970); English rugby union footballer, attended the school until 1983.
