= Fornaraki affair =

Late 19th century blood libel accusation in Egypt

The Fornaraki affair was an accusation of Jewish ritual murder which was made in Egypt in 1881.

== History ==
On May 18, 1881, Evangeli Fornaraki, a nine-year-old Greek Orthodox boy, disappeared in Alexandria. False rumours soon began to spread that he was kidnapped and murdered by the Jewish Barukh family, who were mostly of Greek nationality, with the intention of using his blood for ritual purposes. Members of the family were interrogated and arrested, and anti-Jewish riots broke out in Alexandria.

On May 23 a boatman discovered the body on the seashore. An international commission consisting of thirty-four doctors and the delegates of all the consuls examined the case, and, with the exception of two Greeks, agreed that the child had met with an accidental death by drowning. This was substantiated by the fact that the grains of sand were found in the lungs, showing conclusively that the child was living at the moment it fell into the sea. The Jewish community also appealed to the arbitration of Paul Brouardel, a well-known professor of medical jurisprudence, who testified to the absence of the slightest trace of violence, and endorsed the opinion of the commission. In addition, the Patriarch of Constantinople, Joachim III, published a letter of protest.

Nevertheless, the members of the Barukh family were transported to Corfu, imprisoned, and ill-treated. However, on January 4, 1882, they were freed by the Corfu tribunal.

== See also ==
- Damascus affair
