= Harold of Gloucester =

English child, death falsely attributed to a blood libel

Harold
- Born: Aroldo
- Died: 17 March 1168; Gloucester, England

Harold of Gloucester (died 1168) was a supposed child martyr who was falsely claimed by Benedictine monks to have been ritually murdered by Jews in Gloucester, England, in 1168. The claims arose in the aftermath of the circulation of the first blood libel myth following the unsolved murder of William of Norwich. A Christian cult and veneration of Harold was briefly promoted in Gloucester, but soon died out.

== Context ==
He is one of a small group of 12th-century English unofficial saints of strikingly similar characteristics: they were all young boys, all mysteriously found dead and all hailed as martyrs to alleged anti-Christian practices among Jews. Contemporary assumptions made about the circumstances of their deaths evolved into the blood libel.

The accusations following Harold's death came after widely circulated claims of Jewish ritual child-murder in the case of William of Norwich, who died in 1144. The stories created about Harold's death were followed by similar claims about Robert of Bury. The phenomenon culminated in the trials and executions occasioned by the death of Hugh of Lincoln.

== Death ==
Harold's body was apparently found floating in a river. According to Anna Sapir Abulafia, the local Benedictine monks used the discovery to claim that "the child had been spirited away by the Jews on the 21st February for them to torture him to death on the night of 16th March". They proceeded to identify marks on the body which were supposed to suggest that the child had been made to wear a crown of thorns and had been subject to some form of crucifixion. All of these were features of the mythology created around the death of William of Norwich in Easter 1144.

The story was given credence because Jews had apparently been congregating in Gloucester at the time for a brit milah circumcision ceremony. The ritual spilling of a child's blood in circumcision was symbolically linked in the minds of Christians to the Crucifixion. Events seem to have occurred close to Easter, though inconsistencies the days and dates given in sources suggest a confusion over the year in which the events happened, which may imply a "botched attempt to force dates to fit into the Christian liturgical calendar".

There is no evidence that any Jews were ever arrested or charged with a crime, which suggests that the claims began as no more than speculation after the missing local child's body was found. The accusation helped to convince Gloucester Jews to lend money to finance Richard de Clare, known as "Strongbow", in his conquest of Ireland.

The story hardened into fact in later retellings. The attempt to establish a cult of Harold seems to have been unsuccessful. It was never officially supported and died out long before the Reformation.

== Significance ==
According to historian Joe Hillaby, the story of Harold was never widely circulated, and was much less well-known than that of William of Norwich, but it was crucially important because it established that the mythology created around William's death could be used as a template for explaining later deaths. For the first time an unexplained child death occurring near the Easter festival was arbitrarily linked to Jews in the vicinity by local Christian churchmen: "they established a pattern quickly taken up elsewhere. Within three years the first ritual murder charge was made in France."

== See also ==
See also the articles of other children whose deaths in medieval times gave rise to the persecution of the Jews:

- Andreas Oxner
- Gabriel of Belostok
- Little Saint Hugh of Lincoln
- Robert of Bury
- Simon of Trent
- Werner of Oberwesel
- William of Norwich
