= William of Norwich =

12th-century English boy whose murder was falsely blamed on the Jews of Norwich

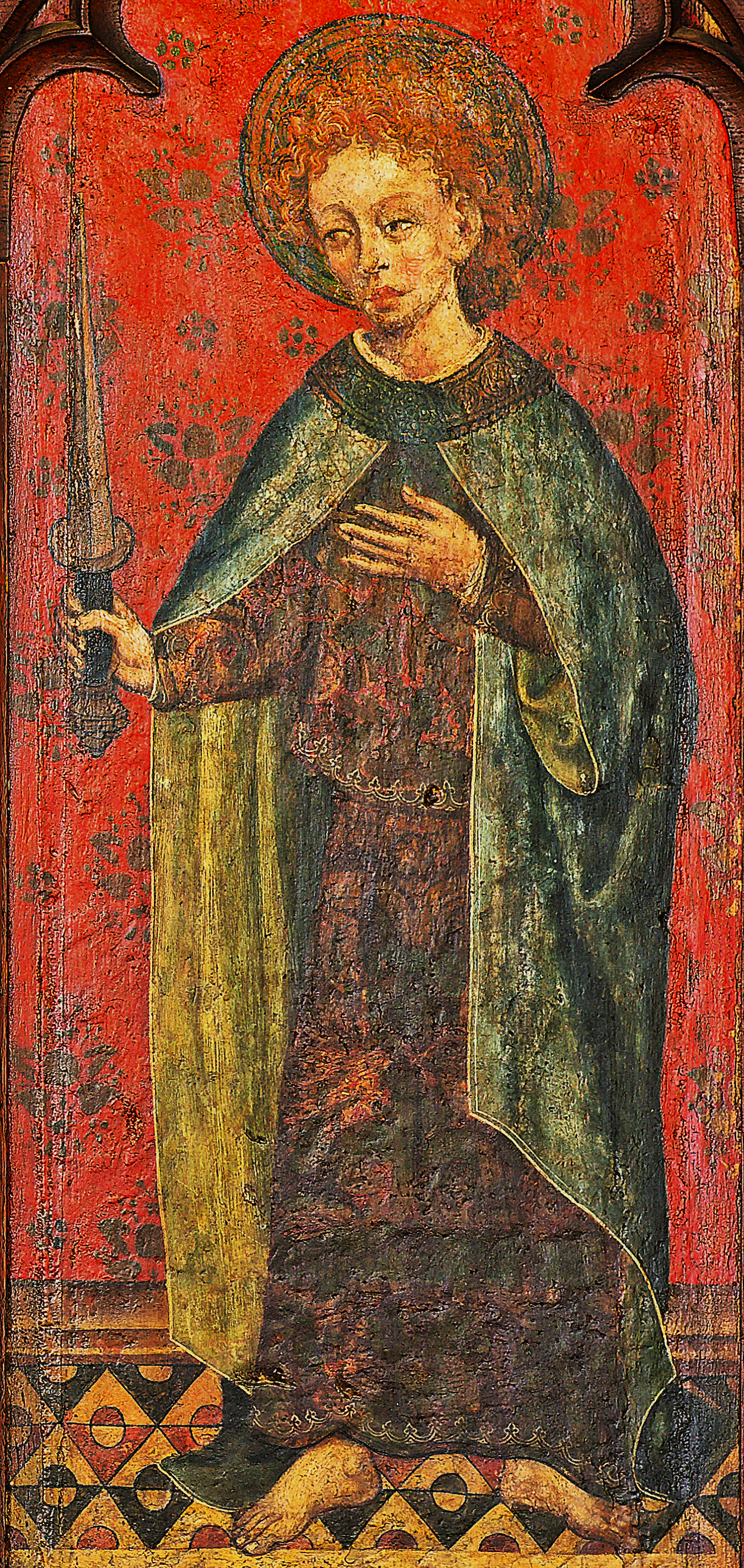
- William depicted on a panel painting at St Mary Magdalene, Norwich (before 1470)
- Born: c. 1132; Norwich, Kingdom of England
- Died: c. 22 March 1144 (aged 12); Thorpe Wood, Norwich
- Canonized: never formally canonized
- Major shrine: previously at Norwich Cathedral
- Feast: 26 March (removed from the Universal Calendar)
- Attributes: Depicted crowned with thorns and holding nails and a hammer, with nail wounds or undergoing crucifixion

William of Norwich (c. 1132 – c. 22 March 1144) was an apprentice who lived in the English city of Norwich, and who was murdered during Easter 1144. The city's French-speaking Jewish community was blamed by some for his death, but the crime was never solved. William's case is the first known example of a medieval blood libel.

The story of the boy originates from the writings of Thomas of Monmouth, a Benedictine monk and a member of Norwich Cathedral Priory, who wrote the hagiographical The Life and Miracles of St William of Norwich in 1150 to state the case for William's claim to sainthood. The priory enshrined William's relics within the cathedral. He was never formally canonised, and the cult surrounding William had faded into obscurity by the 16th century. His relics have since been lost, and almost nothing remains to be seen of the small isolated chapel dedicated to him on Mousehold Heath, reputedly situated close to where his body had originally been found.

== Background ==
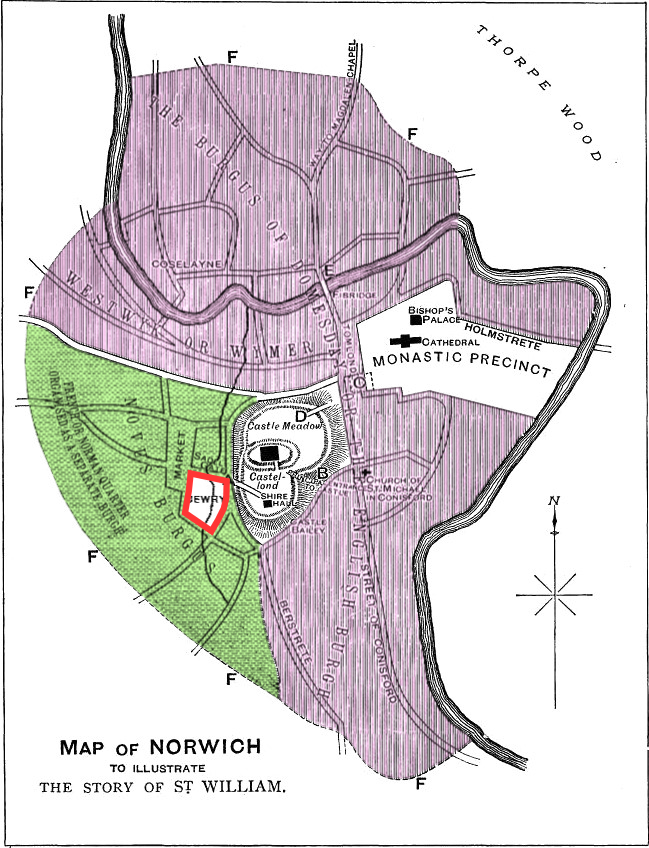
A map based upon a map of medieval Norwich, published in 1896. The Jewry is shown in red, positioned close to the 'Castel-land'.

The Jewish community is thought to have been established in Norwich by 1135, although a Jew named Isaac was recorded in the Domesday Book in 1086. Most of the Jewish community lived in the Jewry, the Jewish quarter of the city, close to the castle. They were closely associated with the ruling Anglo-Norman class, and were under their protection.

Tensions between local Anglo-Saxons and Normans may well have led to the belief that capital crimes by French-speaking Jews were covered up by the French-speaking Normans. Tensions were particularly high during the reign of Stephen.

== Accounts of William's murder ==
=== Anglo-Saxon Chronicle ===
The murder of William of Norwich was mentioned in the Peterborough Chronicle, a version of the Anglo-Saxon Chronicle written between 1273 and 1295. The annal describing William's fate was recorded in or around 1155:

In his time the Jews of Norwich bought a Christian child before Easter, and tortured him with all the same tortures with which our Lord was tortured, and on Long-Friday hanged him on a cross for love of our Lord, and afterwards buried him—imagined that it would be concealed, but our Lord showed that he was a holy martyr, and the monks took him, and buried him reverently in the minster, and through our Lord he performs wonderful and manifold miracles; and he is called St. William.

=== The Life and Miracles of St William of Norwich ===
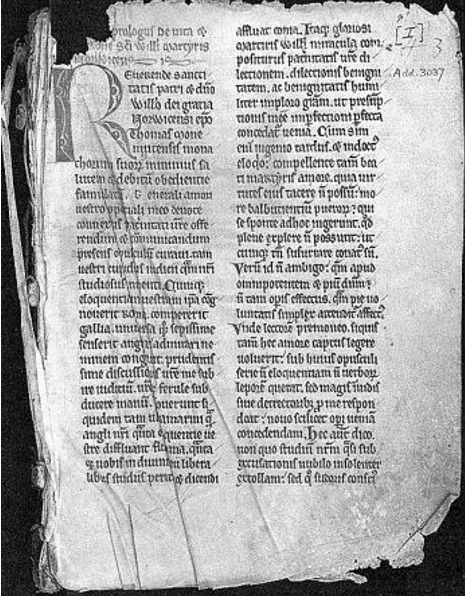
A page from Thomas of Monmouth's Vita (Cambridge University Library (Add MS 3037))

The primary source of information about William of Norwich comes from a single copy of a 12th-century manuscript by Thomas of Monmouth, who arrived in Norwich sometime before 1150 to become a monk at the city's priory, now Norwich Cathedral. The surviving copy may have been made less than 10 years after the original was completed.

In his account of William's life,The Life and Miracles of St William of Norwich (Vita et Passione Sancti Willelmi Martyris Norwicensis), Thomas used stories provided by observers and witnesses of the events surrounding William's death and information given to him about Norwich's Jewish community. He described how he investigated the case, and visited the scene of the crime. The account is set out in seven books, the first two of which contain details of William's murder, evidence in support of the accusation that the Jews killed him, and that he had suffered as a martyr and was therefore a saint.

The surviving manuscript is most likely to have originated from East Anglia, and it may never have left the region. In c. 1700 it was bequeathed to St Mary's Church, Brent Eleigh; it was sold by the church to Cambridge University Library in 1891. The earliest references to The Life and Miracles of St William of Norwich appeared during the 16th century by the antiquary John Leland and the East Anglian churchman John Bale.

== Biography ==
=== Life as an apprentice ===
According to Thomas of Monmouth, William was born on 2 February 1132 to a local couple.

William is said by Thomas to have been apprenticed to a skinner and tanner. (Note: William is the earliest recorded apprentice in English history.) His work brought him into contact with members of the city's Jewish population. His mother was approached by a man claiming to work for the Archdeacon of Norwich; he offered William a job in the Archdeacon's kitchens. Agreeing, she was paid three shillings to let her son go. William and the man then visited William's aunt, who told her daughter to follow William and the man. The last time William was seen alive by his family was on Holy Tuesday, when he and the man went into the house of a local Jew.

=== Murder and burial ===
According to Thomas, William was tortured before being murdered. The body was found on Holy Saturday, 1144, in Thorpe Wood, north of the city. It was seen by a nun, before a forester, Henry de Sprowston, came across William in his jacket and shoes. Henry saw that the boy had been gagged before suffering a violent death. It was decided to bury the boy in unconsecrated ground on Easter Monday. People came to look at him, and William was recognised. The body was then buried at the murder site. The following day, members of William's family, one of whom, Godwin Sturt, was a priest, confirmed him as the victim. He was then reburied following a Requiem Mass.

=== Following events ===
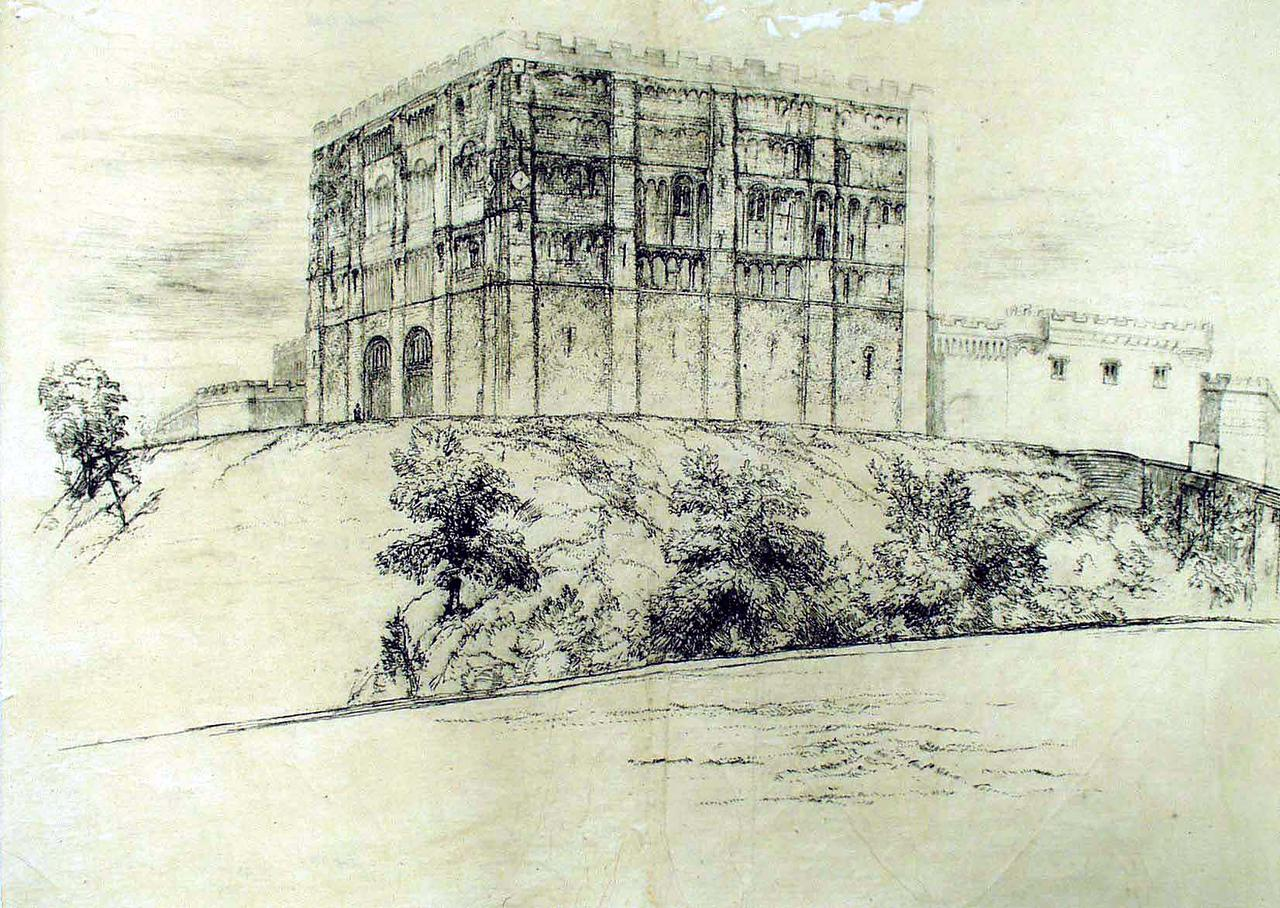
Norwich Castle

William's family and their fellow English quickly blamed the local Jewish community for the crime and demanded justice from the ecclesiastical court of Bishop William de Turbeville. Members of the Jewish community were summoned by the Bishop to attend court and submit to trial by ordeal, but the local Norman sheriff, John de Chesney, advised them that the ecclesiastical court had no jurisdiction over them, as they were not Christians.

He then took the Jews into protection in Norwich Castle. After the situation had calmed down, they returned to their homes. The issue was revived two years later, when a member of the Jewish community was murdered in an unrelated incident. King Stephen agreed to look into the matter, but later decided not to pursue it.

== Aftermath ==
Meanwhile, William's body had been moved to the monastery cemetery. Bishop William and other members of the local clergy attempted to create a cultus around him as a Christian martyr, but this plan did not succeed. There was no evidence in the initial accusations against local Jews that the murder was related to religious activity of any kind, but as the cult developed, so did a story of how and why William was killed.

== Veneration ==
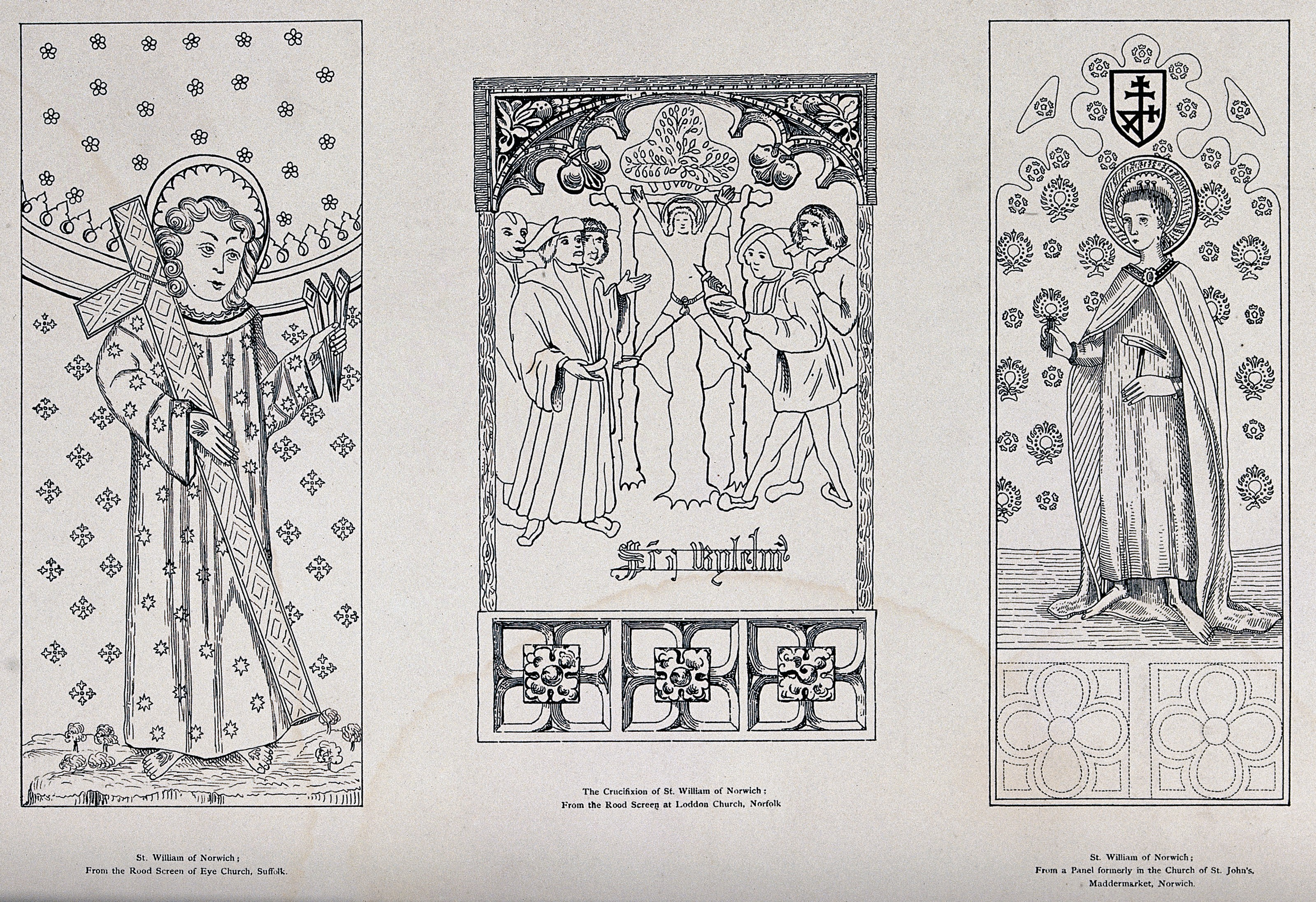
Three engravings of William of Norwich (left to right): from rood screens at Eye, Suffolk and Loddon, Norfolk, and a panel formerly in Saint John the Baptist, Maddermarket, Norwich (Wellcome Collection)

=== Shrine at Norwich Cathedral ===
The wish of the local clergy, in particular, of Bishop William, to establish a cultus may in part have been financially motivated. He encouraged Thomas of Monmouth to question local people and to write a book.

After being buried in the monk's cemetery, William's body was moved to progressively more prestigious places in Norwich Cathedral, being placed in the chapter house in 1150 and close to the high altar in 1151. Thomas of Monmouth's hagiography is mainly devoted to providing evidence for William's sanctity. The book describes lights seen around the body and miraculous cures that occurred upon supplications to William. Monmouth admits in his book that the prior opposed the cult, on the grounds that there was little evidence of William's piety or martyrdom.

According to the historian Paul Dalton, the cult of William was predominantly "protective and pacificatory" in character, having similarities to that of another child saint, Faith of Conques. Despite its origins, the cult itself was not associated with the promotion of anti-Jewish activity. The cult was a minor one even at its height. There is little evidence that it flourished—financial records listing the offerings made at William's shrine suggest that few pilgrims visited it. Offerings continued to be made until as late as 1521.

A boost to the shrine's popularity occurred after 1376, when William was adopted by the Norwich Peltier's Guild, whose annual service at Norwich Cathedral included a child playing the part of William. There was a scholars' guild dedicated to St William in Bishop's Lynn, now King's Lynn.

=== St William's Chapel on Mousehold Heath ===
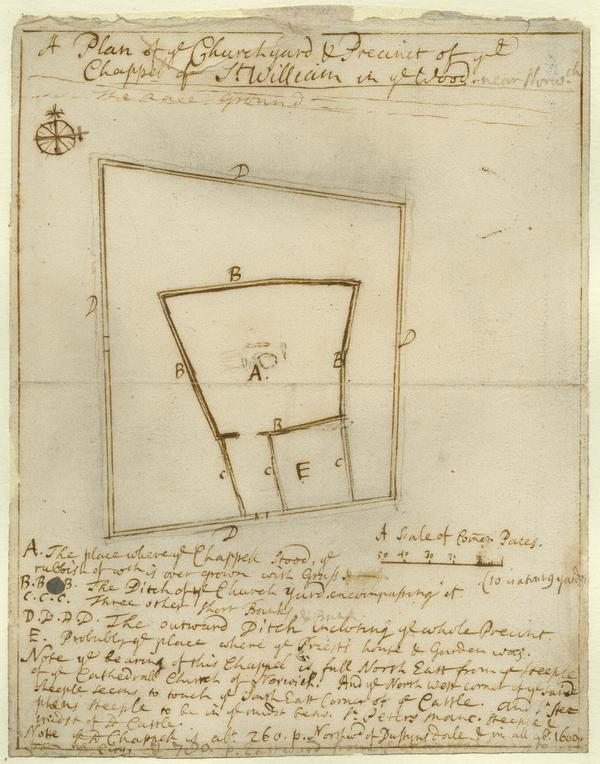
John Kirkpatrick, A Plan of ye Churchyard and Precint of ye Chappel of St William in ye Wood near Norwch (c. 1720)

A wooden chapel may have been built in 1168 by the Bishop of Norwich, William de Turbeville, close to where the 12-year-old's body was found in 1144. According to another tradition, a chapel was founded at around the time of the Conquest which was dedicated to St Catherine, but was rededicated to William in 1168. The earliest reference to St Catherine-in-the-Wood is in a papal bull of 1176, where it was listed among the possessions of Norwich Cathedral Priory and was called St Catherine's Chapel in Thorpe Wood (capellum sancte Katerine in bosco de Thorpe). The last offering at the chapel is recorded in 1506. The exact date of the dissolution is not known, but in 1550 the site was leased out by the cathedral as 'the chapel-yard called St William in the Wood'.

The Norfolk antiquary John Kirkpatrick produced a plan of the site in about 1720. It shows that at this time, few remains of the chapel existed. The earthworks now consist of two concentric enclosures containing mounds of flint rubble which are likely to be the remains of buildings—probably the chapel and associated monks’ quarters. The outer enclosure is likely to have enclosed the former churchyard.

=== Depiction on rood screens ===
Images of William of Norwich can be seen in churches in East Anglia, mainly near Norwich. A panel of painted oak depicting William and Agatha of Sicily, formerly part of a rood screen at St John Maddermarket, Norwich, but now in the Victoria and Albert Museum, shows the boy holding a hammer and with three nails in his head. He also appears on rood screens in the parish churches at Worstead, Loddon, and in Eye, Suffolk.

== Subsequent intolerance towards the Jews of England ==
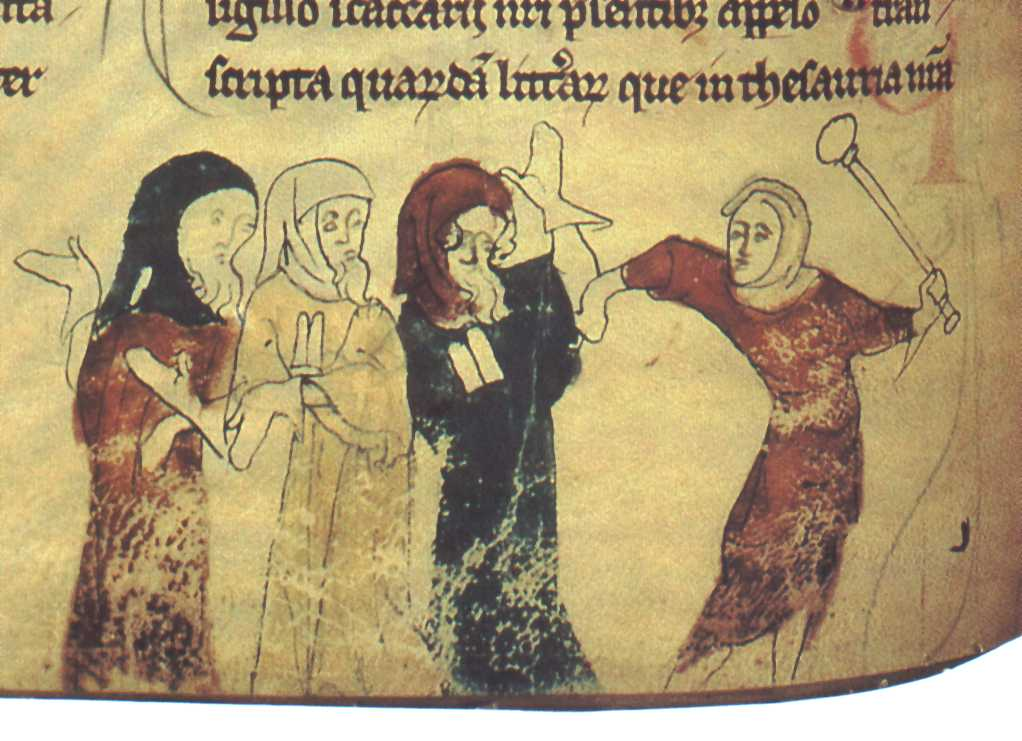
An illustration from the Textus Roffensis depicting the expulsion of the Jews from England in 1290, British Library

As a result of the ill-feelings generated by the murder and subsequent intervention by the authorities in Norwich, a growing suspicion of collusion led to an anti-Jewish and anti-Norman mood in the city. The specific allegation of ritual murder that was made against the Jews of Norwich is the first recorded case of blood libel in the Middle Ages.

Following the death of William, a number of other child murders were at the time attributed to Jews, included the killing of Harold of Gloucester in 1168, Robert of Bury in 1181, and Little Saint Hugh of Lincoln in 1255.

By the reign of Richard the Lionheart attitudes towards English Jews had become less tolerant. This, in conjunction with the increase in national opinion in favour of a Crusade, and the conflation of all non-Christians in the Medieval Christian imagination, led to the Jewish deputation attending the coronation of Richard in 1189 being attacked by the crowd. A widespread attack began on the Jewish population, leading to massacres of Jews at London, Bury, and York, which were followed by others throughout England.

When the Norman nobility of Norwich attempted to suppress attacks upon the Jewish population, the yeomanry and peasants revolted against the lords and attacked their supporters, especially Norwich's Jewish community. On 6 February 1190, Jews who were found in their own houses at Norwich were killed. Many had taken refuge in the castle. (Note: During the development of a new shopping centre in Norwich, in 2004 a well containing the remains of six or more adults and 11 children was discovered. Analysis of the remains showed strong affinities to living Ashkenazi Jewish groups.)

Hostility against Jews continued until, in 1290, Jews were expelled from England by Edward I. Jews were not officially allowed to resettle in England until after 1655, when Lord Protector Oliver Cromwell commissioned the Whitehall Conference to debate the proposals made by Menasseh ben Israel. While the Conference reached no verdict, it is seen as the beginning of resettlement of the Jews in England.

== Later theories relating to the murder ==
=== 19th century ===
The first analysis of the murder was written by the British medievalist scholar M. R. James in 1896. Noting Thomas of Monmouth's use of testimonies to construct a consistent account, James argued that these were inventions or were unreliable, or were manipulated to fit the story. James maintained that the murder's ritual nature emerged only after a man named Theobald, keen to ingratiate himself with the Christian community, promoted the idea. James suggested other causes for William's death, including the possibility of it being an accident, or that William was killed and his murderer, or accidental killer, escaped detection by causing blame for the crime to be placed upon the Jews.

The literary critic Joseph Jacobs speculated in 1897 that William's family had held a mock crucifixion over Easter, during which William fell into a cataleptic trance and died as a result of burial. Jacobs pointed out that Jews would have had to carry the body through Norwich to get to the wood.

=== 20th century – present ===
In 1933, the historian Cecil Roth argued that a different type of mock crucifixion may have led to the accusations against Jews, because of the traditional mock execution of Haman enacted by Medieval Provençal Jews during the festival of Purim. In 1964, Marion Anderson developed this idea, suggesting that William had been told not to associate with Jews following one such masquerade; he died after being tortured by the Jews to find out why they were being ostracised.

In 1984, Canadian Medievalist Gavin I. Langmuir endorsed a theory that the murder was a sex crime, probably perpetrated by the self-described "cook", noting that Thomas of Monmouth's account would imply that William's body was naked below the waist. Langmuir dismissed previous theories, adding that Theobald appeared to have been in Cambridge when the murder was committed. The theory that Theobald killed William was revived in 1988 by Zefirah Rokeah.

It has been suggested that the killer was an unknown sadist, while the accusation of the Jews was made by William's family, who may have been prejudiced against them, including hatred of Jews in general, hatred of the Jews for being foreigners allied with the Normans, and hopes for gaining the local Jews' wealth for themselves. Raphael Langham, writing in 2005, believed that Theobald was a disturbed individual with a hatred of his own community and thus the most likely killer.

Writing in 1938, Jacob R. Marcus commented on the legacy of William of Norwich and other alleged cases like his: "Generations have believed that no Christian child was safe in Jewish hands. Hundreds of Jews have been imprisoned, killed, or burned alive on this charge. The Papacy has frequently denounced this charge, yet it is equally true that in numerous instances the accusation of ritual murder was not made except with the vigorous support of local Church authorities. The author, Thomas of Monmouth, a monk in the Norwich Benedictine monastery, was an exceptionally credulous person. Jessop, one of the editors of Thomas's work, believes that our monkish author belongs to the class of those who are 'deceivers and being deceived'. In the specific case of William of Norwich, the evidence, critically sifted, leads one to believe that he actually existed and that his body was found after he had died a violent death. Everything beyond this, however, is in the realm of speculation."

== Sources ==
- Atherton, Ian (1996). Norwich Cathedral: Church, City, and Diocese, 1096-1996. London: Hambledon Press. ISBN 978-1-85285-134-7.
- Ayers, Brian (1994). English Heritage Book of Norwich. London: Batsford. ISBN 978-0-7134-7568-5.
- Crook, John (2011). English Medieval Shrines. Boydell Press. ISBN 978-1-84383-682-7.
- Dalton, Paul (2000). "Civil War and Ecclessiastical Peace in the Reign of King Stephen". In Dunn, Diana E. S. (ed.). War and Society in Medieval and Early Modern Britain. Liverpool, UK: Liverpool University Press. ISBN 978-08532-3-885-0.
- Husenbeth, Frederick Charles (1850). Emblems of Saints: By Which they are Distinguished in Works of Art. London: Burns and Lambert. OCLC 1044649412.
- Jacobs, Joseph (1897). "Review: St. William of Norwich". Jewish Quarterly Review. 9 (4): 748–755. doi:10.2307/1450801. JSTOR 1450801.
- Jacobs, Joseph (1906). "William of Norwich". Jewish Encyclopedia. Vol. 12.
- Langmuir, Gavin I. (1996). Toward a Definition of Antisemitism. University of California Press. ISBN 978-0-520-06143-9.
- Marcus, Jacob R. (1938). The Jew in the Medieval World: A Source Book 315-1791. Cincinnati: Union of American Hebrew Congregations. OCLC 2033988.
- McCulloh, John M. (1997). "Jewish Ritual Murder: William of Norwich, Thomas of Monmouth, and the Early Dissemination of the Myth". Speculum. 72 (3). The University of Chicago Press: 698–740. doi:10.2307/3040759. JSTOR 3040759. S2CID 162659843.
- Nilson, Ben (1998). Cathedral Shrines of Medieval England. Boydell & Brewer. ISBN 978-0-85115-808-2.
- Porter, Enid (1974). The Folklore of East Anglia. Otowa, New Jersey: Rowman and Littlefield. OCLC 1391537790.
- Rawcliffe, Carole; Wilson, Richard George C, eds. (2006). Medieval Norwich. London: Bloomsbury Publishing. ISBN 978-18528-5-449-2.
- Scolnik, Fred, ed. (2006). "Blood libel". Encyclopedia Judaica (2nd ed.). Macmillan Reference USA. ISBN 978-0-02-865928-2.
- Skinner, Patricia (2003). The Jews in Medieval Britain: Historical, Literary, and Archaeological Perspectives. Boydell Press. ISBN 978-0-85115-931-7.
- Streissguth, Thomas (2008). Richard the Lionheart: Crusader King of England. Berkeley Heights, New Jersey: Enslow. ISBN 9780766027145.
- Swanton, Michael (1997). The Anglo-Saxon Chronicle. London: Routledge. ISBN 978-0-415-92129-9.
- Teter, Magda (2020). Blood Libel: On the Trail of an Antisemitic Myth. Harvard University Press. ISBN 978-0-674-24093-3.
- Yarrow, Simon (2006). Saints and their Communities: Miracle Stories in Twelfth-Century England. Oxford, UK: Oxford University Press. p. 131. ISBN 978-01915-1-579-8.
