= John Mallett =

English rugby union player

John Anthony Mallett (born in Lincoln, 28 May 1970) is a former English rugby union player . He played as a prop, representing both Bath Rugby and England.

Mallett was educated at St Hugh's School, Woodhall Spa until age of 13, he then moved to Borough Road College then later Millfield and played for Bath Rugby until 2002. Bath won 3 titles in the Guinness Premiership, in 1992/93, 1993/94 and 1995/96, and 3 titles in the Anglo-Welsh Cup, in 1993/94, 1994/95 and 1995/96. Mallet's team also won the Heineken Cup, in 1997/98, for the final of which he was a replacement. While a student at Borough Road College, he played for Bath United, Somerset Colts and England Students, at a World Cup in Italy.

Mallett was selected for England, to take part in the 1995 Rugby World Cup finals; he played a single match against Manu Samoa which proved to be his only appearance for the senior England side. He is now head of rugby at Millfield School, Somerset.
