= Robert of Bury =

English blood libel

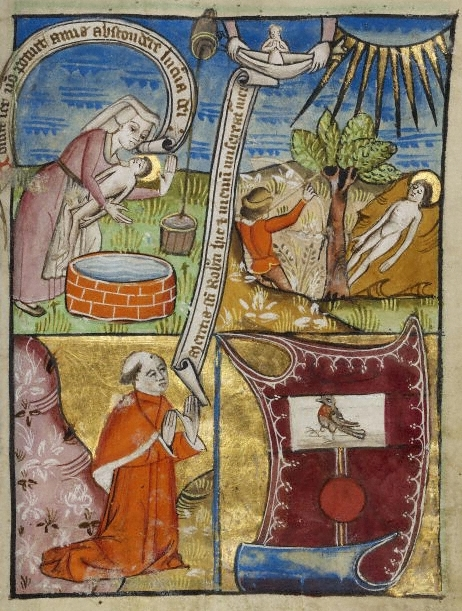
- 15th-century illumination depicting the martyrdom of Robert of Bury. Top left, a woman seems to be placing Robert's body (with a halo) in a well; top right, it is lying next to a tree with an archer standing by. The precise meaning of these scenes is unknown. At bottom, a monk prays to Robert's soul
- Died: 1181; Gloucester, England

Robert of Bury (died 1181) was an English boy, allegedly murdered and found in the town of Bury St Edmunds, Suffolk in 1181. His death, which occurred at a time of rising antisemitism, was blamed on local Jews. Though a hagiography of Robert was written, no copies are known, so the story of his life is now unknown beyond the few fragmentary references to it that survive. His cult continued until the English Reformation.

Robert of Bury joined a small group of 12th-century English unofficial saints of strikingly similar characteristics: all young boys, all mysteriously found dead and all hailed as martyrs to alleged anti-Christian practices among Jews. Contemporary assumptions made about the circumstances of their deaths are typical of blood libel. The first of these was William of Norwich (d.1144), whose death and cult were probably an influence on the story that grew up around the death of Robert.

== Cult ==
Tradition states that Robert was kidnapped and then killed on Good Friday 1181. By the 1190s Robert had become the focus of a martyr cult. Jocelyn de Brakelond, a monk of Bury St. Edmunds, later wrote a chronicle covering this period. He also mentions writing a book about the life and miracles performed by the boy saint, but this book has not survived.

Information about the circumstances of his death remains unclear. The monk John de Taxster is the source for the date. Jocelyn's surviving account, in his history of the abbey of Bury, says only "the saintly boy Robert was murdered and buried in our church; many signs and wonders were performed among the people as I have recorded elsewhere." Another record merely states that he was "martyred" at Easter by Jews. A later record refers to him as "a boy crucified by the Jews".

John Lydgate wrote a poem entitled Prayer for St. Robert, which implies that the story of his death closely mirrored that of William of Norwich, in which Jews are supposed to have kidnapped the child with the help of a Judas-like Christian accomplice, and tortured and then crucified him over Easter in a parody of Jesus's death. Lydgate says he was "scourged and nailed to a tree". An illustration to a Latin prayer to Robert depicts him lying dead in a ditch beside a tree, with an archer nearby shooting an arrow upwards, illuminated by a giant sun. Another image shows a woman holding the child over a well with the inscription "the old woman wished, but was not able, to hide the light of God". This may be the "nurse" obliquely mentioned in Lydgate's poem, possibly the Christian accomplice. Alternatively, she may be a Jewish woman trying to hide the body after the murder.

Nothing more is known about the supposed events surrounding his death, or about Robert's identity, life or family.

== Significance ==
Historian Anthony Bale argues that the cult of Robert arose because of the influence of the nearby cult of William of Norwich. Though Bury St Edmunds already held the tomb of St. Edmund the Martyr, after which the town is named, the cult of William was a rival, so a local boy-martyr was desirable if the abbey was to retain its pilgrims. According to historian Joe Hillaby, the death of a boy called Harold in Gloucester in 1168 had already established that William's death could be used as a template for later unexplained deaths of male children occurring around Easter. It "established a pattern quickly taken up elsewhere. Within three years the first ritual murder charge was made in France."

Bale, referring to the research of Hillaby, suggests that the cult was promoted at a time when the abbey at Norwich was attempting to assert authority over Bury. He argues that Samson of Tottington, Abbot of Bury St Edmunds from 1182 to 1211, decided that the town needed the cult to preserve its independence. It may have also been linked to local political rivalries, as Samson was trying to undermine his rival William the Sacrist who had business links with the town's Jews.

The cult of Robert may have served as a contributing factor in the later violent attack upon the Jews of Bury St Edmunds on Palm Sunday 1190, in which fifty-seven were killed. The whole surviving Jewish community was immediately thereafter expelled from the town by order of Abbot Samson. According to Bale, the cult may have paved the way for the expulsion, "demonising the Jews for the practical purpose of their removal", but not enough is known about its early history to be sure that it did not develop as a retrospective justification for the expulsion.

== See also ==
Other children whose deaths in medieval times gave rise to the persecution of the Jews:

In England

- William of Norwich
- Harold of Gloucester
- Little Saint Hugh of Lincoln

Others

- Andreas Oxner
- Werner of Oberwesel
- Simon of Trent
