= Blood libel =

Antisemitic trope

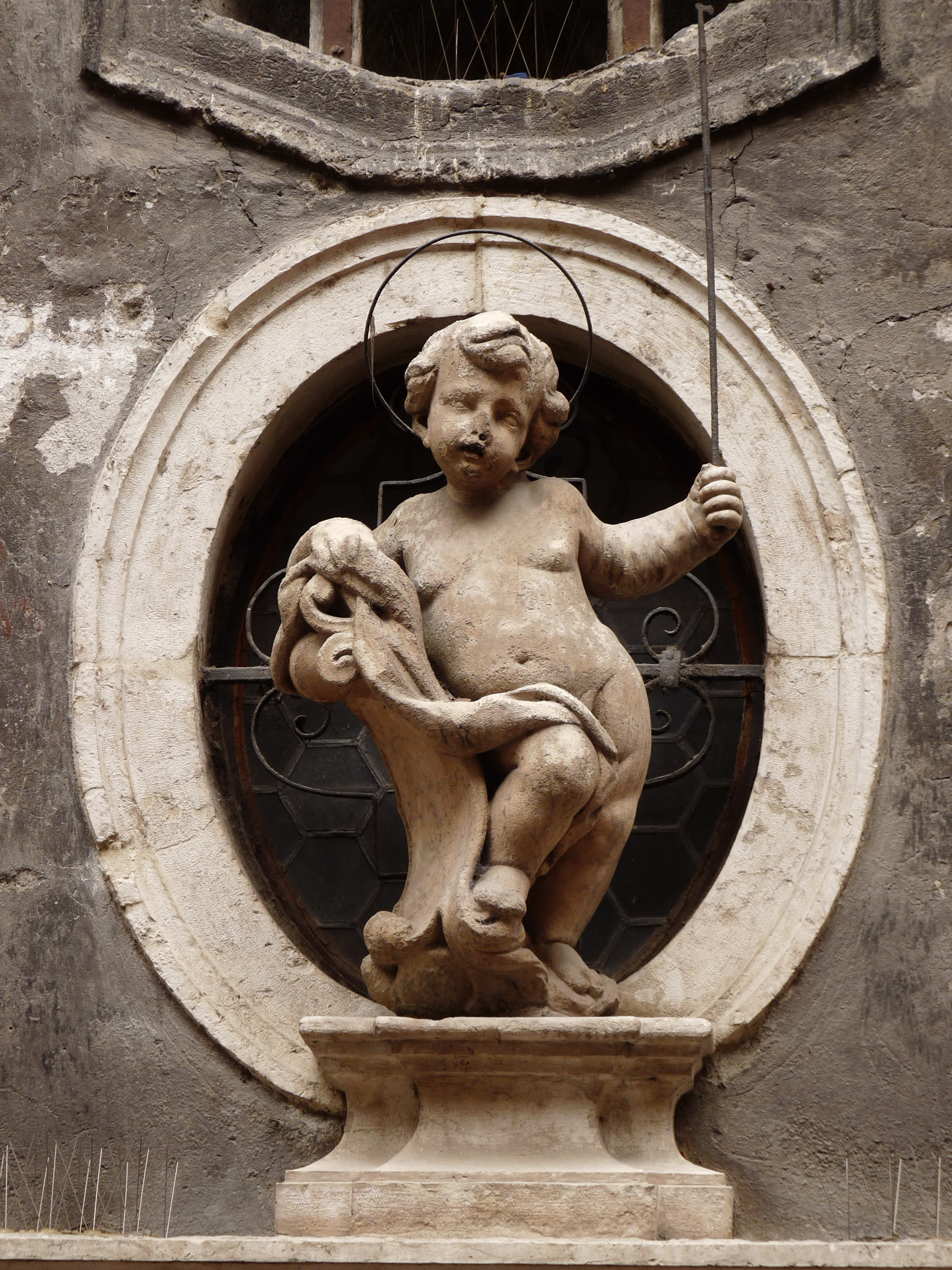
Statue of Simon of Trent, an Italian child whose disappearance and death was blamed on the leaders of the city's Jewish community

Blood libel or ritual murder libel (also blood accusation) is an antisemitic trope which falsely accuses Jews of murdering Christians in order to use their blood in the performance of religious rituals. Echoing ancient myths of secret cultic practices in many prehistoric societies, the claim, as it is leveled against Jews, was rarely attested to in antiquity. According to Tertullian, it originally emerged in late antiquity as an accusation made against members of the early Christian community of the Roman Empire. Once this accusation had been dismissed, it was revived a millennium later as a Christian slander against Jews in the medieval period. The first examples of medieval blood libel emerged in the Kingdom of England in the 1140s, before spreading into other parts of Europe, especially France and Germany. This libel, alongside those of well poisoning and host desecration, became a major theme of the persecution of Jews in Europe from that period down to modern times.

Blood libels often claim that Jews require human blood for the baking of matzos, an unleavened flatbread which is eaten during Passover. Earlier versions of the blood libel accused Jews of ritually re-enacting the crucifixion. The accusations often assert that the blood of Christian children is especially coveted, and historically, blood libel claims have been made in order to account for the otherwise unexplained deaths of children. In some cases, the alleged victims of human sacrifice have become venerated as Christian martyrs. Many of these – most prominently William of Norwich (1144), Little Saint Hugh of Lincoln (1255), and Simon of Trent (1475) – became objects of local cults and veneration; the cult of Hugh of Lincoln gained the support of Henry III and his son Edward I, giving it official credibility and helping it to be particularly well remembered. Although he was never canonized, the veneration of Simon was added to the General Roman Calendar. One child who was allegedly murdered by Jews, Gabriel of Białystok, was canonized by the Russian Orthodox Church.

In Jewish lore, blood libels served as the impetus for the creation of the Golem of Prague by Rabbi Judah Loew ben Bezalel in the 16th century. The term 'blood libel' has also been used in reference to any unpleasant or damaging false accusation, and as a result, it has acquired a broader metaphoric meaning. However, this wider usage of the term remains controversial.

== History ==
The earliest versions of the accusations involving Jews supposedly crucifying Christian children on Easter/Passover is said to be because of a prophecy. There is no reference to the use of blood in unleavened matzo bread at this time yet, which develops later as a major motivation for the crime.

=== Possible precursors ===
The earliest known antecedent is from the tenth century, from Damocritus (not Democritus the philosopher), mentioned in the Suda, who alleged that "every seven years the Jews captured a stranger, brought him to the temple in Jerusalem, and sacrificed him, cutting his flesh into bits." The Greco-Egyptian author Apion claimed that the Jews sacrificed Greek victims in their temple. Here, the writer states that when Antiochus Epiphanes entered the temple in Jerusalem, he discovered a Greek captive, who told him that he was being fattened for sacrifice. Every year, Apion claimed, the Jews would sacrifice a Greek and consume his flesh, at the same time swearing eternal hatred towards the Greeks. Apion's claim likely reflects already circulating attitudes towards Jews as similar claims are made by Posidonius and Apollonius Molon in the 1st century BCE. This idea is exampled later in history, when Socrates Scholasticus (fl. 5th century) reported that in a drunken frolic, a group of Jews bound a Christian child to a cross in mockery of the death of Christ and scourged him until he died.

=== Medieval context ===
The blood libels emerged at a time when the church and particularly the Crusades were driving increasingly anti-Judaic discourses. These were later reinforced through the Church council Lateran IV which mandated the segregation of Christian and Jewish society, and built an apparatus of enforcement across Europe. At a local context, many of the English examples may have included an element of church competition for saintly cults, with the income that veneration produced.

Israel Yuval proposed that the blood libel may have originated in the 12th century due to Christian views on Jewish behavior during the First Crusade. Some Jews committed suicide and killed their own children rather than exposing them to forced conversion to Christianity. Yuval wrote that Christians may have argued that if Jews could kill their own children, they could also kill Christian children.

=== Origins in England ===
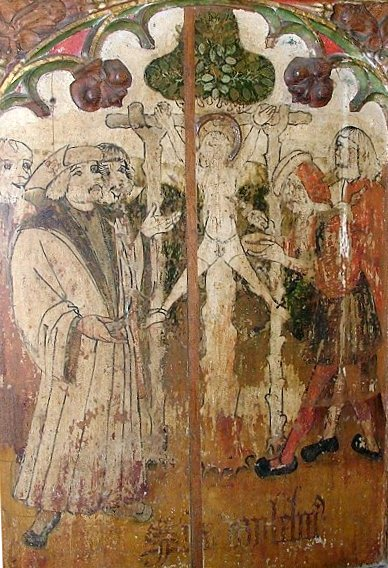
The crucifixion of William of Norwich depicted on a rood screen in Holy Trinity church, Loddon, Norfolk

In England, in 1144, the Jews of Norwich were falsely accused of ritual murder after a boy, William of Norwich, was found dead in the woods with stab wounds. William's hagiographer, Thomas of Monmouth, falsely claimed that every year there is an international council of Jews at which they choose the country in which a child will be killed during Easter, because of a Jewish prophecy that states that the killing of a Christian child each year will ensure that the Jews will be restored to the Holy Land. According to Monmouth, England was chosen in 1144, and the leaders of the Jewish community delegated the Jews of Norwich to perform the killing, after which they abducted and crucified William. The legend was turned into a cult, with William acquiring the status of a martyr and pilgrims bringing offerings to the local church.

This was followed by similar accusations in Gloucester (1168), Bury St Edmunds (1181) and Bristol (1183). In 1189, the Jewish deputation attending the coronation of Richard the Lionheart was attacked by the crowd. Massacres of Jews at London and York soon followed. In 1190, on 16 March, 150 Jews were attacked in York and then massacred when they took refuge in the royal castle, where Clifford's Tower now stands, with some committing suicide rather than being taken by the mob. The remains of 17 bodies thrown in a well in Norwich between the 12th and 13th century (five that were shown by DNA testing to likely be members of a single Jewish family) were very possibly killed as part of one of these pogroms.

After the death of Little Saint Hugh of Lincoln, there were trials and executions of Jews. The case was described by Matthew Paris and later by Chaucer, and formed the basis of the Sir Hugh ballads which have circulated to the present day. Its notoriety sprang from the intervention of the Crown, the first time an accusation of ritual killing had been given royal credibility.

The eight-year-old Hugh disappeared at Lincoln on 31 July 1255. His body was probably discovered on 29 August, in a well. A Jew named Copin or Koppin confessed to involvement. He confessed to John of Lexington, a servant of the crown, and relative of the Bishop of Lincoln. He confessed that the boy had been crucified by the Jews, who had assembled at Lincoln for that purpose. King Henry III, who had reached Lincoln at the beginning of October, had Copin executed and 91 of the Jews of Lincoln seized and sent up to London, where 18 of them were executed. The rest were pardoned at the intercession of the Franciscans or Dominicans.

Within a few decades, Jews would be expelled from all of England in 1290 and not allowed to return until 1657. After the expulsion, Edward I renovated "Little Saint Hugh's" shrine and decorated it with his Royal insignia, as part of his efforts to justify his actions. As Stacey notes: "A more explicit identification of the crown with the ritual crucifixion charge can hardly be imagined."

=== Continental Europe ===
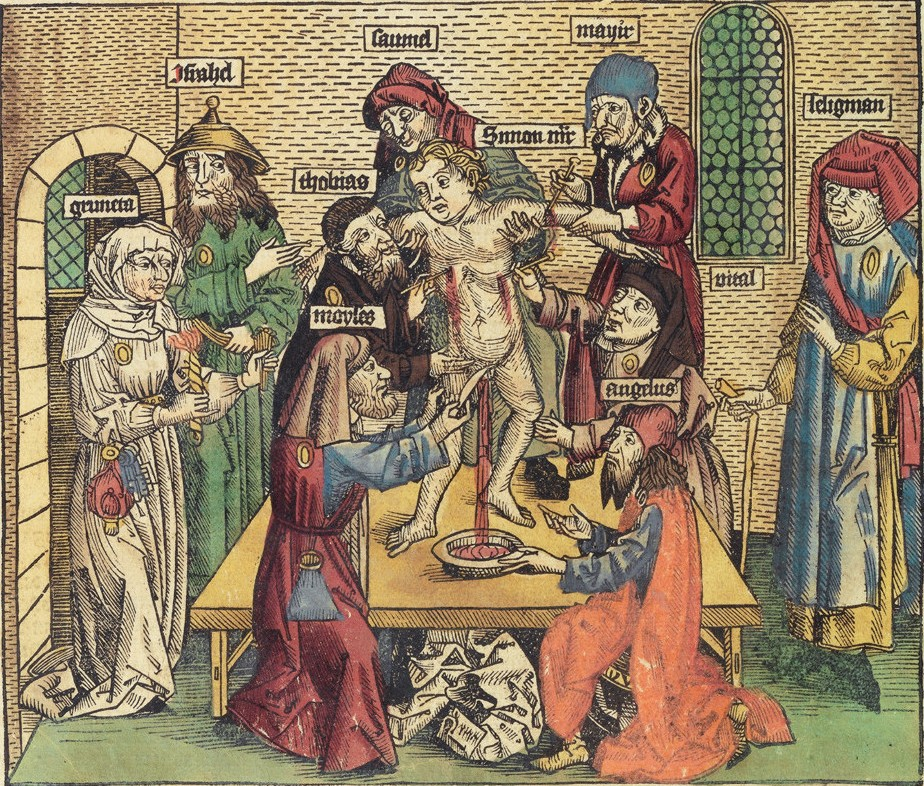
Simon of Trent blood libel. Illustration in Hartmann Schedel's Weltchronik, 1493

Much like the blood libel of England, the history of blood libel in continental Europe consists of unsubstantiated claims made about the corpses of Christian children. There were frequently associated supernatural events speculated about these discoveries and corpses, events which were often attributed by contemporaries to miracles. Also, just as in England, these accusations in continental Europe typically resulted in the execution of numerous Jews – sometimes even all, or close to all, the Jews in one town. These accusations and their effects also, in some cases, led to royal interference on behalf of the Jews.

Thomas of Monmouth's story of the annual Jewish meeting to decide which local community would kill a Christian child also quickly spread to the continent. An early version appears in Bonum Universale de Apibus ii. 29, § 23, by Thomas of Cantimpré (a monastery near Cambray). Thomas wrote, in around 1260, "It is quite certain that the Jews of every province annually decide by lot which congregation or city is to send Christian blood to the other congregations." Thomas of Cantimpré also believed that since the time when the Jews called out to Pontius Pilate, "His blood be on us, and on our children" (Matthew 27:25), they have been afflicted with hemorrhages, a condition equated with male menstruation:

A very learned Jew, who in our day has been converted to the (Christian) faith, informs us that one enjoying the reputation of a prophet among them, toward the close of his life, made the following prediction: 'Be assured that relief from this secret ailment, to which you are exposed, can only be obtained through Christian blood ("solo sanguine Christiano").' This suggestion was followed by the ever-blind and impious Jews, who instituted the custom of annually shedding Christian blood in every province, in order that they might recover from their malady.

Thomas added that the Jews had misunderstood the words of their prophet, who by his expression "solo sanguine Christiano" had meant not the blood of any Christian, but that of Jesus – the only true remedy for all physical and spiritual suffering. Thomas did not mention the name of the "very learned" proselyte, but it may have been Nicholas Donin of La Rochelle, who, in 1240, had a disputation on the Talmud with Yechiel of Paris, and who in 1242 caused the burning of numerous Talmudic manuscripts in Paris. It is known that Thomas was personally acquainted with Nicholas. Nicholas Donin and another Jewish convert, Theobald of Cambridge, are greatly credited with the adoption and the belief of the blood libel myth in Europe.

The first known case outside England was in Blois, France, in 1171. This was the site of a blood libel accusation against the town's entire Jewish community that led to around 31–33 Jews (with 17 women making up this total) being burned to death on 29 May of that year, or the 20th of Sivan of 4931. The blood libel revolved around R. Isaac, a Jew whom a Christian servant reported had deposited a murdered Christian in the Loire. The child's body was never found. The count had about 40 adult Blois Jews arrested and they were eventually to be burned. The surviving members of the Blois Jewish community, as well as surviving holy texts, were ransomed. As a result of this case, the Jews garnered new promises from the king. The burned bodies of the sentenced Jews were supposedly maintained unblemished through the burning, a claim which is a well-known miracle, martyr myth for both Jews and Christians. There is significant primary source material from this case including a letter revealing moves for Jewish protection with King Louis VII. Responding to the mass execution, the Twentieth of Sivan was declared a fast day by Rabbenu Tam. In this case in Blois, there was not yet the myth proclaimed that Jews needed the blood of Christians.

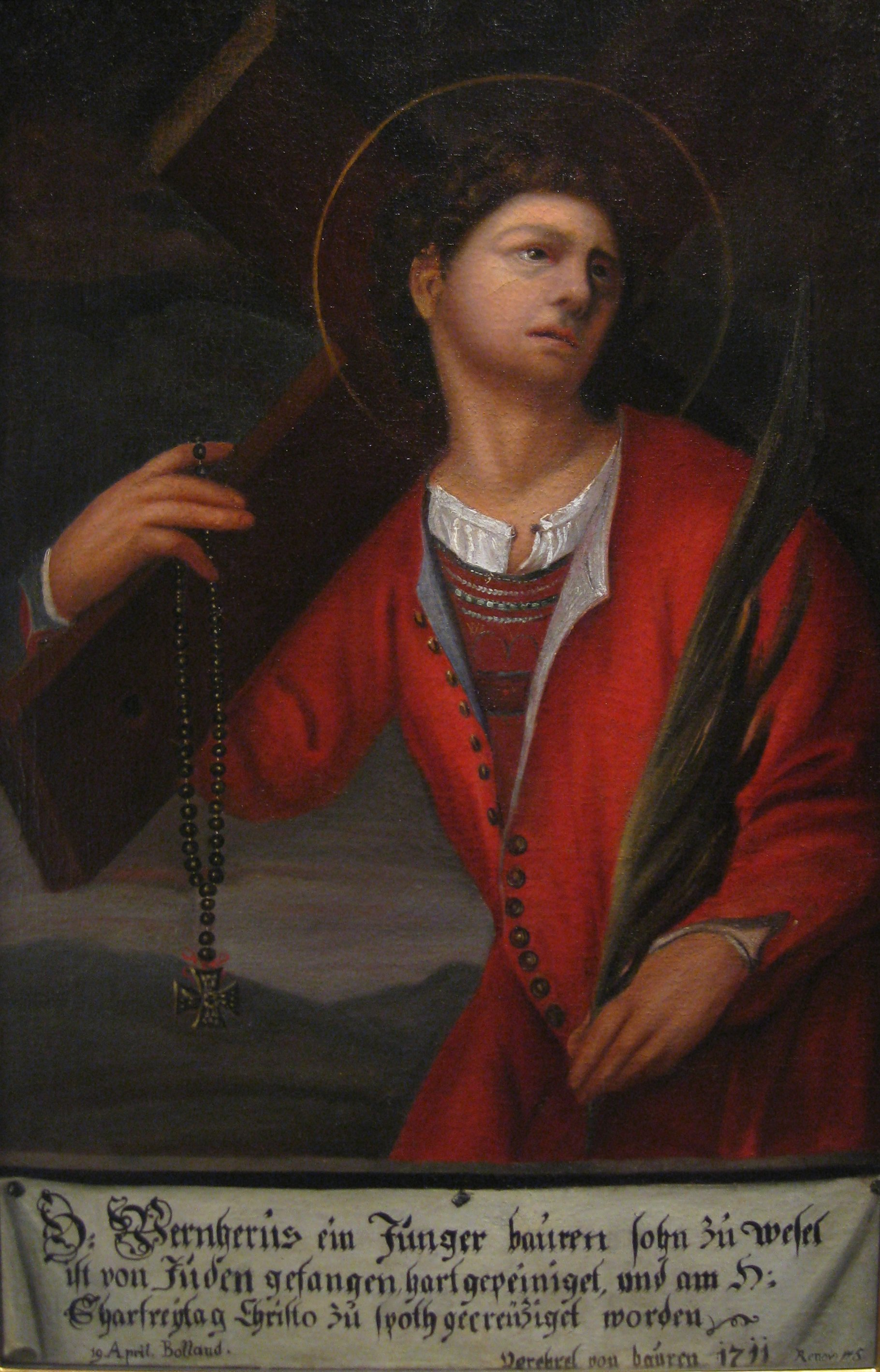
Painting of Werner of Oberwesel as a martyr

In 1235, after the dead bodies of five boys were found on Christmas Day in Fulda, the inhabitants of the town claimed the Jews had killed them to consume their blood, and burned 34 Jews to death with the help of Crusaders assembled at the time. Even though emperor Frederick II cleared the Jews of any wrongdoing after an investigation, blood libel accusations persisted in Germany. At Pforzheim, Baden, in 1267, a woman supposedly sold a girl to Jews who, according to the myth, then cut her open and dumped her in the Enz River, where boatmen found her; the girl cried for vengeance, and then died. The body was said to have bled as the Jews were brought to it. The woman and the Jews allegedly confessed and were subsequently killed. That a judicial execution was summarily committed in consequence of the accusation is evident from the manner in which the Nuremberg "Memorbuch" and the synagogal poems refer to the incident.

In 1270, at Weissenburg, of Alsace, a supposed miracle alone decided the charge against the Jews. A child's body had shown up in the Lauter River; it was claimed that Jews had cut into the child to acquire his blood, and that the child continued bleeding for five days.

At Oberwesel, near Easter of 1287, alleged miracles again constituted the only evidence against the Jews. In this case, it was claimed that the corpse of the 16-year-old Werner of Oberwesel (also referred to as "Good Werner") landed at Bacharach and the body performed miracles, particularly medicinal miracles. Light was also said to have been emitted by the body. Reportedly, the child was hung upside down, forced to throw up the host and was cut open. In consequence, the Jews of Oberwesel and many other adjacent localities were severely persecuted during the years 1286–89. The Jews of Oberwesel were particularly targeted because there were no Jews remaining in Bacharach following a 1283 pogrom. Additionally, there were pogroms following this case as well at and around Oberwesel. Rudolph of Habsburg, to whom the Jews had appealed for protection, in order to manage the miracle story, had the archbishop of Mainz declare great wrong had been done to the Jew. This apparent declaration was very limited in effectiveness.

A statement was made, in the Chronicle of Konrad Justinger of 1423, that at Bern in 1293 or 1294 the Jews tortured and murdered a boy called Rudolph (sometimes also referred to as Ruff, or Ruof). The body was reportedly found by the house of Jöly, a Jew. The Jewish community was then implicated. The penalties imposed upon the Jews included torture, execution, expulsion, and steep financial fines. Justinger argued Jews were out to harm Christianity. The historical impossibility of this widely credited story was demonstrated by Jakob Stammler, pastor of Bern, in 1888.

There have been several explanations put forth as to why these blood libel accusations were made and perpetuated. For example, it has been argued Thomas of Monmouth's account and other similar false accusations, as well as their perpetuation, largely had to do with the economic and political interests of leaders perpetuating these myths. The use of blood and other human products for medicinal or magical purposes was an established concept in medieval Europe. As such illegal ways of accessing these item were ascribed (in 1507) by Franciscans to Dominicans, by others to sorcerers and devil worshippers as well as Jews.

=== Renaissance and Baroque ===
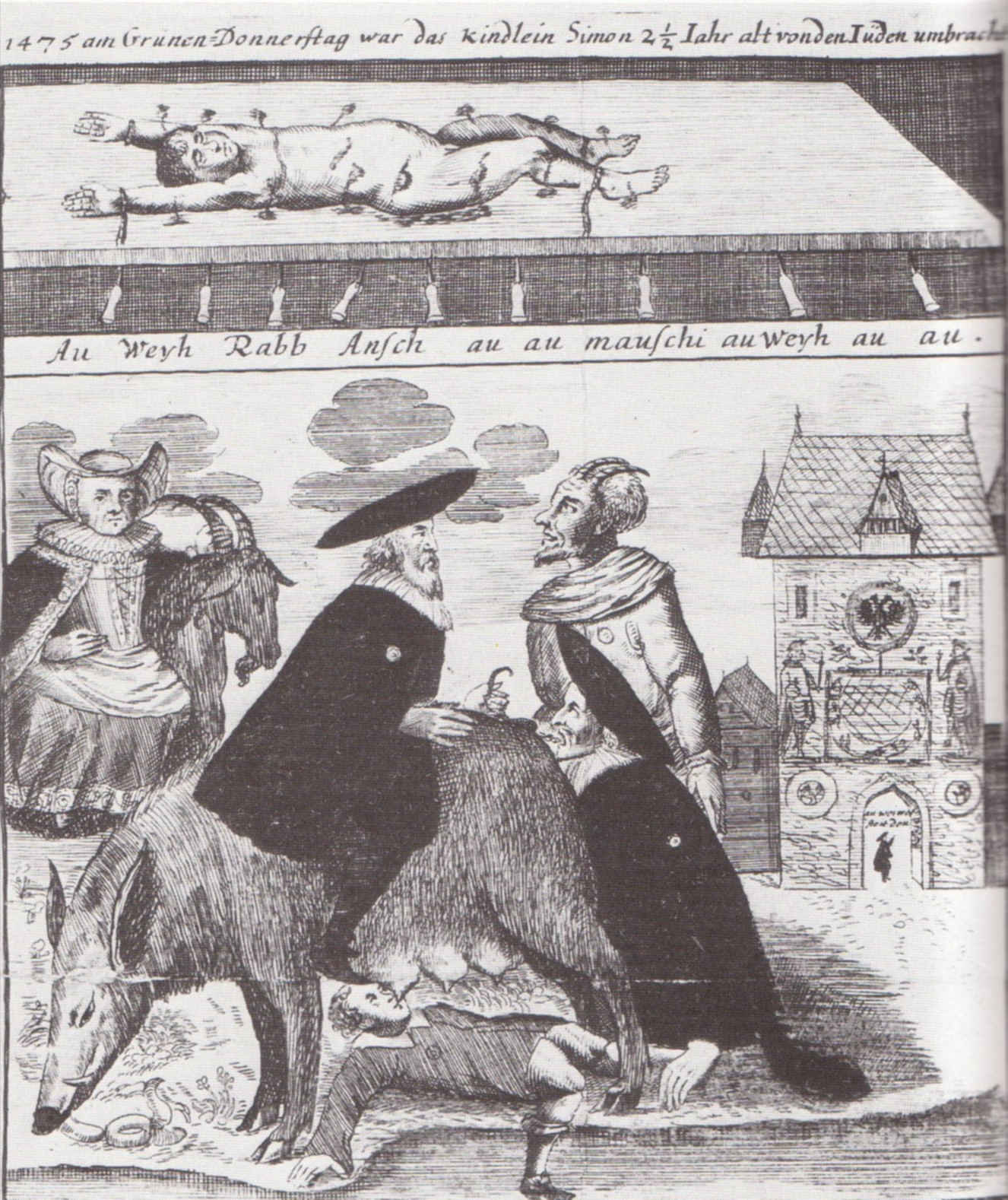
From an 18th-century etching from Brückenturm. Above: The murdered body of Simon of Trent. Below: The "Judensau"

In Ravensburg in 1430, a blood libel saw most of the city's Jewish community burned after being charged with the ritual murder of a 13-year-old Christian boy called Ludwig Ettelin. Ettelin's body was found hanging from a tree in the Haßlach forest, heavily scavenged post-mortem. Popular suspicion quickly alighted on a wealthy Jewish merchant named Eleazarus who was alleged to have conspired with two other prominent Jewish townspeople to murder the boy at his daughter's wedding some three months earlier. Under severe torture, Eleazarus confessed to the accusations against him. The town's remaining Jews were burned alive as co-conspirators on 3 July. Their property was confiscated by the civic officials and handed over to Sigismund, the Holy Roman Emperor. The following year, the town decreed that Jews never again be permitted into the town. The decree stood until the early nineteenth century.

In 1475, Simon of Trent, aged two, disappeared and his father alleged that he had been kidnapped and murdered by the local Jewish community. Fifteen local Jews were sentenced to death and burned. Simon was regarded locally as a saint, although he was never canonised by the church of Rome. He was removed from the Roman Martyrology in 1965 by Pope Paul VI.

In 1490, a four-year-old Christian boy named Christopher of Toledo, also known as Christopher of La Guardia or "the Holy Child of La Guardia", was supposedly murdered by two Jews and three conversos (converts to Christianity). In total, eight men were executed. It is now believed that this case was constructed by the Spanish Inquisition to facilitate the expulsion of Jews from Spain.

In 1494 a case at Trnava, Slovakia, the impossible forced confessions from women and children shows that the accused preferred death as a means of escape from the torture, and admitted everything that was asked of them. They even said that Jewish men menstruated and practiced the drinking of Christian blood as a remedy.

At Pezinok, Slovakia in 1529, it was charged that a nine-year-old boy had been bled to death, suffering cruel torture; thirty Jews confessed to the crime and were publicly burned. The true facts of the case were disclosed later when the child was found alive in Vienna. He had been taken there by the accuser, Count Wolf of Bazin, as a means of ridding himself of his Jewish creditors at Bazin.

In Rinn in 1492, a boy named Andreas Oxner (also known as Anderl von Rinn) was said to have been bought by traveling merchants and cruelly murdered by them in a forest near the city, his blood being carefully collected in vessels. The accusation of drawing off the blood (without murder) was not made until the beginning of the 17th century when his cult was founded. The older inscription in the church of Rinn, dating from 1575, is distorted by fabulous embellishments – for example, that the money paid for the boy to his godfather turned into leaves, and that a lily blossomed upon his grave. The cult continued until officially prohibited in 1994 by the Bishop of Innsbruck.

On 17 January 1670, Raphael Levy, a member of the Jewish community of Metz, was executed on charges of the ritual murder of a peasant child who had gone missing in the woods outside the village of Glatigny on 25 September 1669, the eve of Rosh Hashanah.

Sandomierz, a city in Poland, has been the venue of a number of blood libel cases, leading to the torture and execution of several people. One such case from 1698 involved Małgorzata, a dead two-year-old Christian girl whose corpse was deposited in a church mortuary by her mother, and the Jew she accused under torture, Aleksander Berek. Both the mother and Berek were executed. Other cases are known from earlier dates, and in 1710 another one followed: the body of a boy, Jerzy Krasnowski, was found, a local rabbi was accused of killing him, with the result that the rabbi along with several other Jews died in prison during the proceeding, and three more Jews were sentenced and executed.

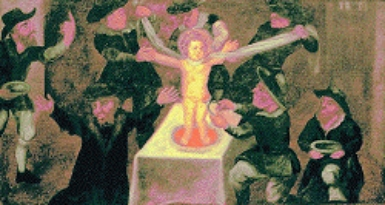
Fresco in St Paul's Church in Sandomierz, Poland, depicting blood libel

=== 19th century ===
One of the child-saints in the Russian Orthodox Church is the six-year-old boy Gavriil Belostoksky from the village Zverki. According to the legend supported by the church, the boy was kidnapped from his home during the holiday of Passover while his parents were away. Shutko, who was a Jew from Białystok, was accused of bringing the boy to Białystok, piercing him with sharp objects and draining his blood for nine days, then bringing the body back to Zverki and dumping it at a local field. A cult developed, and the boy was canonized in 1820. His relics are still the object of pilgrimage. On All Saints Day, 27 July 1997, the Belarusian state TV showed a film alleging the story is true. The revival of the cult in Belarus was cited as a dangerous expression of antisemitism in international reports on human rights and religious freedoms which were passed to the UNHCR.

- 1821 Odessa pogroms: in the aftermath of the Greek War of Independence and killing of Gregory V of Constantinople by the Ottomans, Jews were blamed and accused of using Christian blood for ritual purposes and again in 1859, of ritually murdering a Christian child. Ritual murder accusations appeared again around the 1881 pogrom after the assassination of Alexander II of Russia.
- 1823–35 Velizh blood libel: After a Christian child was found murdered outside of this small Russian town in 1823, accusations by a drunk prostitute led to the imprisonment of many local Jews. Some were not released until 1835.
- 1840 Damascus affair: In February, at Damascus, a Catholic monk named Father Thomas and his servant disappeared. The accusation of ritual murder was brought against members of the Jewish community of Damascus.
- 1840 Rhodes blood libel: The Jews of Rhodes, under the Ottoman Empire, were accused of murdering a Greek Christian boy. The libel was supported by the local governor and the European consuls posted to Rhodes. Several Jews were arrested and tortured, and the entire Jewish quarter was blockaded for twelve days. An investigation carried out by the central Ottoman government found the Jews to be innocent.
- In 1844, David Paul Drach, the son of the Head Rabbi of Paris and a convert to Christianity, wrote in his book De L'harmonie Entre L'eglise et la Synagogue, that a Catholic priest in Damascus had been ritually killed and the murder covered up by powerful Jews in Europe; referring to the 1840 Damascus affair [See above]
- In 1851–53, a case of blood libel took place in Surami, Georgia (then part of the Russian Empire): seven Jewish men, all versed in religious matters, were falsely accused of the murder of a Christian (Georgian) boy for ritual purposes. Local investigators pressed the case for three years before the Governing Senate in St Petersburg, the Russian Empire's highest judicial organ, convicted and exiled the accused to remote provinces. Soviet, Israeli and Georgian scholars agree that the Russian imperial state, especially Viceroy Mikhail Vorontsov, was heavily involved, even manipulated the case to ensure a conviction. This conviction greatly influenced the Kutaisi case (1878–80, see below).
- In the Lombardo-Venetian Kingdom in Badia, in the Province of Rovigo on June 25, 1855, a 21-year-old peasant woman from Masi, Giuditta Castilliero, returned after eight days missing and claimed she escaped from a ritual murder. She showed wounds on her arms as evidence of bloodletting, giving evidence to her story of blood libel. She testified that a fellow townsman, Caliman Ravenna, was one of the parties responsible. Ravenna was a wealthy merchant, entrepreneur, district tax collector, moneylender and member of the elite in Badia. He was taken into custody on a charge of public violence, and rumours concerning the matter spread throughout the region. The case was moved to the Court of Rovigo. There, the magistrate and other criminal authorities rapidly reviewed the case and immediately arrested the alleged perpetrator. On July 9, Giuditta Castilliero was arrested for a theft in Legnago that took place during the days she had been reportedly missing. This contradicted her testimony, and Caliman Ravenna was released on July 14 and welcomed back into his community. Castilliero was charged with slander, a more serious crime than theft, and was sentenced to six years of hard labour. It was believed she had been put up to make the accusation by a criminal network, personal enemies of Ravella.
- In March 1879, nine Jewish men from the village of Sachkhere were brought to Kutaisi, Georgia to stand trial for the alleged kidnapping and murder of a Christian girl. The case attracted a great deal of attention in the Russian Empire (of which Georgia was then a part): "While periodicals as diverse in tendency as Herald of Europe and Saint Petersburg Notices expressed their amazement that medieval prejudice should have found a place in the modern judiciary of a civilized state, New Times hinted darkly of strange Jewish sects with unknown practices." The trial ended in acquittal, and the professor of Oriental languages Daniel Chwolson (St Petersburg University) published a refutation of the blood libel.
- 1882 Tiszaeszlár blood libel: The Jews of the village of Tiszaeszlár, Hungary were accused of the ritual murder of a fourteen-year-old Christian girl, Eszter Solymosi. The case was one of the main causes of the rise of antisemitism in the country. The accused persons were eventually acquitted.
- In 1899, Hilsner Affair: Leopold Hilsner, a Czech Jewish vagabond, was accused of murdering a nineteen-year-old Christian woman, Anežka Hrůzová, with a slash to the throat. Despite the absurdity of the charge and the relatively progressive nature of society in Austria-Hungary, Hilsner was convicted and sentenced to death. He was later convicted of an additional unsolved murder, also involving a Christian woman. In 1901, the sentence was commuted to life imprisonment. Tomáš Masaryk, a prominent Austro-Czech philosophy professor and future president of Czechoslovakia, spearheaded Hilsner's defense. He was later blamed by Czech media because of this. In March 1918, Hilsner was pardoned by Austrian emperor Charles I. He was never exonerated, and the true guilty parties were never found.

=== 20th and 21st centuries ===
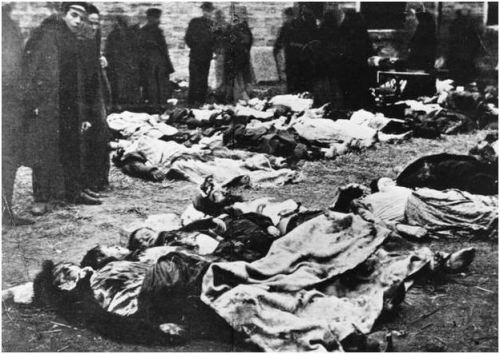
Victims of the Kishinev Pogrom of 1903, caused by a blood libel

- The 1903 Kishinev pogrom, an anti-Jewish revolt, started when an antisemitic newspaper wrote that a Christian Russian boy, Mikhail Rybachenko, was found murdered in the town of Dubossary, alleging that the Jews killed him in order to use the blood in preparation of matzo. Around 49 Jews were killed and hundreds were wounded, with over 700 houses being looted and destroyed.
- In the 1910 Shiraz blood libel, the Jews of Shiraz, Iran, were falsely accused of murdering a Muslim girl. The entire Jewish quarter was pillaged; the pogrom left 12 Jews dead and about 50 injured.

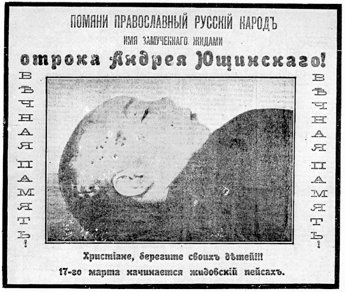
Antisemitic flier in Kiev in the 1910s with a picture of the dead Yushchinskyi, issued some time during the trial of Beilis, that read: "Christians, take care of your children!!! It will be the Jews' Passover on 17 March."

- In Kiev, a Jewish factory manager, Menahem Mendel Beilis, was accused of murdering 13-year-old Andriy Yushchinskyi, a Christian child, and using his blood to make matzos. He was acquitted by an all-Christian jury after a sensational trial in 1913.
- In 1928, the Jews of Massena, New York were falsely accused of kidnapping and killing a Christian girl in the Massena blood libel.
- Jews were frequently accused of the ritual murder of Christians for their blood in Der Stürmer, an antisemitic newspaper which was published in Nazi Germany. The infamous May 1934 issue of the paper was later banned by the Nazi authorities, because it went so far as to compare alleged Jewish ritual murder with the Christian rite of communion.
- In Tattarisuo case, where several severed heads, arms and other body parts were discovered in a spring, the far-right media in Finland blamed the case on Jewish ritual murder.
- In 1938 the British fascist politician and veterinarian Arnold Leese published an antisemitic booklet in defense of the Blood Libel which he titled My Irrelevant Defence: Meditations inside Gaol and Out on Jewish Ritual Murder.
- The 1944–1946 anti-Jewish violence in Poland, which according to some estimates killed as many as 1,000–2,000 Jews (237 documented cases), involved, among other elements, accusations of blood libel, especially in the case of the 1946 Kielce pogrom.
- King Faisal of Saudi Arabia (r. 1964–1975) made accusations against Parisian Jews that took the form of a blood libel.
- The Matzah of Zion was written by the Syrian Defense Minister, Mustafa Tlass in 1986. The book concentrates on two issues: renewed ritual murder accusations against the Jews in the Damascus affair of 1840, and The Protocols of the Elders of Zion. The book was cited at a United Nations conference in 1991 by a Syrian delegate. On 21 October 2002, the London-based Arabic paper Al-Hayat reported that the book The Matzah of Zion was undergoing its eighth reprinting and it was also being translated into English, French and Italian. Egyptian filmmaker Munir Radhi has announced plans to adapt the book into a film.
- In 2003, a private Syrian film company created a 29-part television series Ash-Shatat ("The Diaspora"). This series originally aired in Lebanon in late 2003 and it was subsequently broadcast by Al-Manar, a satellite television network owned by Hezbollah. This TV series, based on the antisemitic forgery The Protocols of the Learned Elders of Zion, shows the Jewish people engaging in a conspiracy to rule the world, and it also presents Jews as people who murder the children of Christians, drain their blood and use it to bake matzah.
- In early January 2005, some 20 members of the Russian State Duma publicly made a blood libel accusation against the Jewish people. They approached the Prosecutor General's Office and demanded that Russia "ban all Jewish organizations." They accused all Jewish groups of being extremist, "anti-Christian and inhumane, and even accused them of practices that include ritual murders." Alluding to previous antisemitic Russian court decrees that accused the Jews of ritual murder, they wrote that "Many facts of such religious extremism were proven in courts." The accusation included traditional antisemitic canards, such as the claim that "the whole democratic world today is under the financial and political control of international Jewry. And we do not want our Russia to be among such unfree countries". This demand was published as an open letter to the prosecutor general, in Rus Pravoslavnaya (Русь православная, "Orthodox Russia"), a national-conservative newspaper. This group consisted of members of the ultra-nationalist Liberal Democrats, the Communist faction, and the nationalist Motherland party, with some 500 supporters. The mentioned document is known as "The Letter of Five Hundred" ("Письмо пятисот"). Their supporters included editors of nationalist newspapers as well as journalists. By the end of the month, this group was strongly criticized, and it retracted its demand in response.
- At the end of April 2005, five boys, ages 9 to 12, in Krasnoyarsk (Russia) disappeared. In May 2005, their burnt bodies were found in the city sewage. The crime was not disclosed, and in August 2007 the investigation was extended until 18 November 2007. Some Russian nationalist groups claimed that the children were murdered by a Jewish sect with a ritual purpose. Nationalist M. Nazarov, one of the authors of "The Letter of Five Hundred" alleges "the existence of a 'Hasidic sect', whose members kill children before Passover to collect their blood", using the Beilis case mentioned above as evidence. M.Nazarov also alleges that "the ritual murder requires throwing the body away rather than its concealing". "The Union of the Russian People" demanded officials thoroughly investigate the Jews, not stopping at the search in synagogues, Matzah bakeries and their offices.
- During a speech in 2007, Raed Salah, the leader of the northern branch of the Islamic Movement in Israel, referred to Jews in Europe having in the past used children's blood to bake holy bread. "We have never allowed ourselves to knead [the dough for] the bread that breaks the fast in the holy month of Ramadan with children's blood", he said. "Whoever wants a more thorough explanation, let him ask what used to happen to some children in Europe, whose blood was mixed in with the dough of the [Jewish] holy bread."
- In the 2000s, a team of Polish anthropologists and sociologists investigated the currency of the blood libel myth in Sandomierz where a painting depicting the blood libel adorns the Cathedral, and Orthodox faithful in villages near Białystok, and they discovered that these beliefs persist among some Catholic and Orthodox Christians. The fact that local Jews were saved by orders from the bishop, who saw them hide in the very same cathedral during the Holocaust, gave rise to hopes of transforming Sandomierz into a symbol of hope for the checkered historical Polish-Jewish relations.

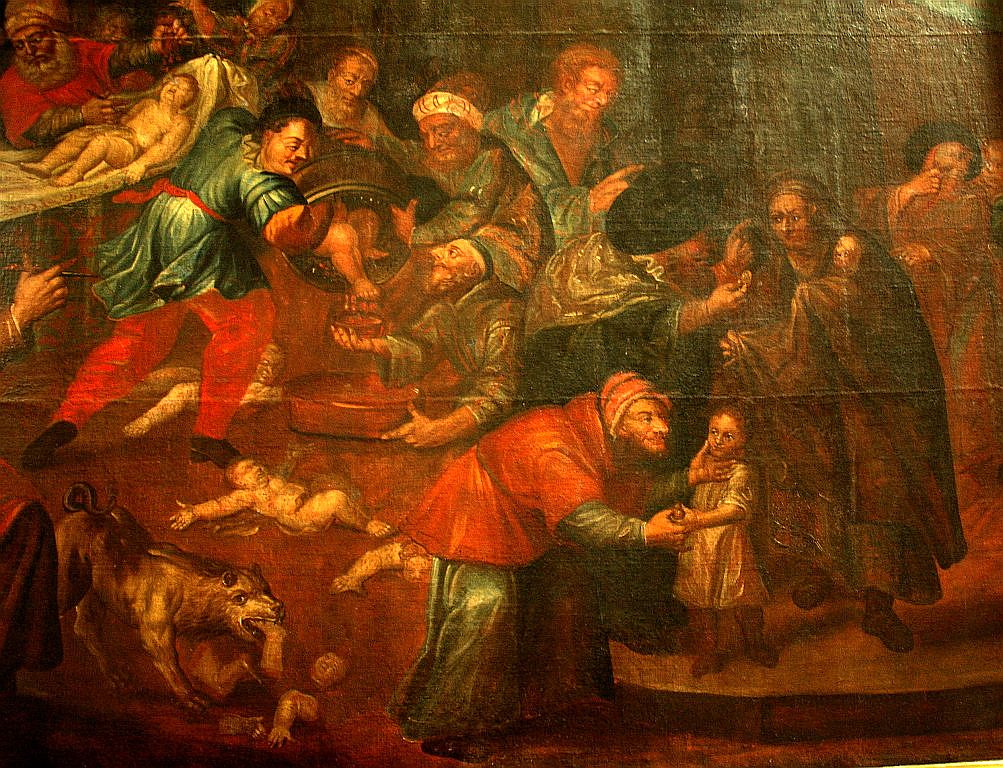
Blood libel, 18th-century painting by Karol de Prevot in Sandomierz Cathedral

- In an address that aired on Al-Aqsa TV, a Hamas run TV station in Gaza, on 31 March 2010, Salah Eldeen Sultan (Arabic: صلاح الدين سلطان), founder of the American Center for Islamic Research in Columbus, Ohio, the Islamic American University in Southfield, Michigan, and the Sultan Publishing Co. and described in 2005 as "one of America's most noted Muslim scholars", alleged that Jews kidnap Christians and others in order to slaughter them and use their blood for making matzos. Sultan, who is currently a lecturer on Muslim jurisprudence at Cairo University stated that: "The Zionists kidnap several non-Muslims [sic] – Christians and others... this happened in a Jewish neighborhood in Damascus. They killed the French doctor, Toma, who used to treat the Jews and others for free, in order to spread Christianity. Even though he was their friend and they benefited from him the most, they took him on one of these holidays and slaughtered him, along with the nurse. Then they kneaded the matzos with the blood of Dr. Toma and his nurse. They do this every year. The world must know these facts about the Zionist entity and its terrible corrupt creed. The world should know this." (Translation by the Middle East Media Research Institute)
- During an interview which aired on Rotana Khalijiya TV on 13 August 2012, Saudi Cleric Salman Al-Odeh stated (as translated by MEMRI) that "It is well known that the Jews celebrate several holidays, one of which is the Passover, or the Matzos Holiday. I read once about a doctor who was working in a laboratory. This doctor lived with a Jewish family. One day, they said to him: 'We want blood. Get us some human blood.' He was confused. He didn't know what this was all about. Of course, he couldn't betray his work ethics in such a way, but he began inquiring, and he found that they were making matzos with human blood." Al-Odeh also stated that "[Jews] eat it, believing that this brings them close to their false god, Yahweh" and that "They would lure a child in order to sacrifice him in the religious rite that they perform during that holiday."
- In April 2013, the Palestinian non-profit organization MIFTAH, founded by Hanan Ashrawi apologized for publishing an article which criticized US President Barack Obama for holding a Passover Seder in the White House by saying "Does Obama, in fact, know the relationship, for example, between 'Passover' and 'Christian blood'...?! Or 'Passover' and 'Jewish blood rituals?!' Much of the chatter and gossip about historical Jewish blood rituals in Europe is real and not fake as they claim; the Jews used the blood of Christians in the Jewish Passover." MIFTAH's apology expressed its "sincerest regret".
- In an interview which aired on Al-Hafez TV on 12 May 2013, Khaled Al-Zaafrani of the Egyptian Justice and Progress Party, stated (as translated by MEMRI): "It's well known that during the Passover, they [the Jews] make matzos called the 'Blood of Zion.' They take a Christian child, slit his throat and slaughter him. Then they take his blood and make their [matzos]. This is a very important rite for the Jews, which they never forgo... They slice it and fight over who gets to eat Christian blood." In the same interview, Al-Zaafrani stated that "The French kings and the Russian czars discovered this in the Jewish quarters. All the massacring of Jews that occurred in those countries were because they discovered that the Jews had kidnapped and slaughtered children, in order to make the Passover matzos."
- In an interview which aired on the Al-Quds TV channel on 28 July 2014 (as translated by MEMRI), Osama Hamdan, the top representative of Hamas in Lebanon, stated that "we all remember how the Jews used to slaughter Christians, in order to mix their blood in their holy matzos. This is not a figment of imagination or something taken from a film. It is a fact, acknowledged by their own books and by historical evidence." In a subsequent interview with CNN's Wolf Blitzer, Hamdan defended his comments, stating that he "has Jewish friends".
- In a sermon broadcast on the official Jordanian TV channel on 22 August 2014, Sheik Bassam Ammoush, a former Minister of Administrative Development who was appointed to Jordan's House of Senate ("Majlis al-Aayan") in 2011, stated (as translated by MEMRI): "In [the Gaza Strip] we are dealing with the enemies of Allah, who believe that the matzos that they bake on their holidays must be kneaded with blood. When the Jews were in the diaspora, they would murder children in England, in Europe, and in America. They would slaughter them and use their blood to make their matzos... They believe that they are God's chosen people. They believe that the killing of any human being is a form of worship and a means to draw near their god."
- Accusations of genocide against Palestinians by Israel have been alleged to be a form of "blood libel" by some supporters of Israel and by various Israeli governments. In contrast, dismissing the Gaza genocide as a blood libel has been alleged as Gaza genocide denial.
- In April 27, 2019, John Earnest entered Poway synagogue in Poway, California and fatally shot one woman and injured three other people, including the synagogue's rabbi. In the manifesto that is attributed to him, he wrote that he was avenging the martyrdom of Simon of Trent: "You are not forgotten Simon of Trent, the horror that you and countless children have endured at the hands of the Jews will never be forgiven".
- In March 2020, Italian painter Giovanni Gasparro unveiled a painting of the martyrdom of Simon of Trent, titled "Martirio di San Simonino da Trento (Simone Unverdorben), per omicidio rituale ebraico (The Martyrdom of St. Simon of Trento in accordance with Jewish ritual murder)". The painting was condemned by the Italian Jewish community and the Simon Wiesenthal Center, among others.
- The QAnon conspiracy theory has been accused of advancing blood libel tropes through its belief that Hollywood elites are harvesting adrenochrome from children through Satanic ritual abuse in order to become immortal. In February 2022, a sculpture of Simon of Trent depicting the blood libel was used to promote the adrenochrome-harvesting conspiracy theory.
- In 2025, a former fixed-term academic at University College London claimed the Damascus affair blood libel to have been accurate in a lecture on Zionism.

== Views of the Catholic Church ==
The attitude of the Catholic Church towards these accusations and the cults venerating children supposedly killed by Jews has varied over time. The Papacy generally opposed them, although it had problems in enforcing its opposition.

In 1911, the Dictionnaire apologétique de la foi catholique, an important French Catholic encyclopedia, published an analysis of the blood libel accusations. This may be taken as being broadly representative of educated Catholic opinion in continental Europe at that time. The article noted that the popes had generally refrained from endorsing the blood libel, and it concluded that the accusations were unproven in a general sense, but it left open the possibility that some Jews had committed ritual murders of Christians. Other contemporary Catholic sources (notably the Jesuit periodical La Civiltà Cattolica) promoted the blood libel as truth.

Today, the accusations are rarer in Catholic circles. While Simon of Trent's local status as a saint was removed in 1965, several towns in Spain still commemorate the blood libel.

=== Papal pronouncements ===
Pope Innocent IV took action against the blood libel: "5 July 1247 Mandate to the prelates of Germany and France to annul all measures adopted against the Jews on account of the ritual murder libel, and to prevent the accusation of Arabs on similar charges" (The Apostolic See and the Jews, Documents: 492–1404; Simonsohn, Shlomo, pp. 188–189, 193–195, 208). In 1247, he wrote also that "Certain of the clergy, and princes, nobles and great lords of your cities and dioceses have falsely devised certain godless plans against the Jews, unjustly depriving them by force of their property, and appropriating it themselves;... they falsely charge them with dividing up among themselves on the Passover the heart of a murdered boy...In their malice, they ascribe every murder, wherever it chance to occur, to the Jews. And on the ground of these and other fabrications, they are filled with rage against them, rob them of their possessions without any formal accusation, without confession, and without legal trial and conviction, contrary to the privileges granted to them by the Apostolic See... Since it is our pleasure that they shall not be disturbed,... we ordain that ye behave towards them in a friendly and kind manner. Whenever any unjust attacks upon them come under your notice, redress their injuries, and do not suffer them to be visited in the future by similar tribulations."

Pope Gregory X (1271–1276) issued a letter which criticized the practice of blood libels and forbade arrests and persecution of Jews based on a blood libel, ... unless — which we do not believe — they be caught in the commission of the crime.

Pope Benedict XIV wrote the bull Beatus Andreas (22 February 1755) in response to an application for the formal canonization of the 15th-century Andreas Oxner, a folk saint alleged to have been murdered by Jews "out of hatred for the Christian faith". Benedict did not dispute the claim that Jews murdered Christian children, and in anticipating that further cases on this basis would be brought appears to have accepted it as accurate, but decreed that in such cases beatification or canonization would be inappropriate.

== Blood libels in the Islamic world ==
In late 1553 or 1554, Suleiman the Magnificent, the reigning sultan of the Ottoman Empire, issued a firman (royal decree) which formally denounced blood libels against the Jews.

In 1840, following the Western outrage arising from the Damascus affair, British politician and leader of the British Jewish community, Sir Moses Montefiore, backed by other influential westerners including Britain's Lord Palmerston and Damascus consul Charles Henry Churchill, the French lawyer Adolphe Crémieux, Austrian consul Giovanni Gasparo Merlato, Danish missionary John Nicolayson, and Solomon Munk, persuaded Sultan Abdulmejid I in Constantinople, to issue a firman on 6 November 1840 intended to halt the spread of blood libel accusations in the Ottoman Empire. The edict declared that blood libel accusations were a slander against Jews and they would be prohibited throughout the Ottoman Empire, and read in part:

... and for the love we bear to our subjects, we cannot permit the Jewish nation, whose innocence for the crime alleged against them is evident, to be worried and tormented as a consequence of accusations which have not the least foundation in truth...

In the remainder of the 19th century and into the 20th century, there were many instances of the blood libel in Ottoman lands, such as the 1881 Fornaraki affair. However the libel almost always came from the Christian community, sometimes with the connivance of Greek or French diplomats. The Jews could usually count on the goodwill of the Ottoman authorities and increasingly on the support of British, Prussian and Austrian representatives.

In the 1910 Shiraz blood libel, the Jews of Shiraz, Iran, were falsely accused of murdering a Muslim girl. The entire Jewish quarter was pillaged, with the pogrom leaving 12 Jews dead and about 50 injured.

In 1983, Mustafa Tlass, the Syrian Minister of Defense, wrote and published The Matzah of Zion, which is a treatment of the Damascus affair of 1840 that repeats the ancient "blood libel", that Jews use the blood of murdered non-Jews in religious rituals such as baking Matza bread. In this book, he argues that the true religious beliefs of Jews are "black hatred against all humans and religions", and no Arab country should ever sign a peace treaty with Israel. Tlass re-printed the book several times. Following the book's publication, Tlass told Der Spiegel, that this accusation against Jews was valid and he also claimed that his book is "an historical study ... based on documents from France, Vienna and the American University in Beirut."

In 2003, the Egyptian newspaper Al-Ahram published a series of articles by Osama El-Baz, a senior advisor to the then Egyptian President Hosni Mubarak. Among other things, Osama El-Baz explained the origins of the blood libel against the Jews. He said that Arabs and Muslims have never been antisemitic, as a group, but he accepted the fact that a few Arab writers and media figures attack Jews "on the basis of the racist fallacies and myths that originated in Europe". He urged people not to succumb to "myths" such as the blood libel.

Nevertheless, on many occasions in modern times, blood libel stories have appeared in the state-sponsored media of a number of Arab and Muslim nations, as well as on their television shows and websites. The blood libel was featured in a scene in the Syrian TV series Ash-Shatat, shown in 2003.

In 2007, Lebanese poet Marwan Chamoun, in an interview aired on Télé Liban, referred to the "... slaughter of the priest Tomaso de Camangiano ... in 1840... in the presence of two rabbis in the heart of Damascus, in the home of a close friend of this priest, Daud Al-Harari, the head of the Jewish community of Damascus. After he was slaughtered, his blood was collected, and the two rabbis took it." A novel, Death of a Monk, based on the Damascus affair, was published in 2004.

== See also ==
- Blood atonement, former Mormon practice
- Blood curse, New Testament passage
- Blood ritual
- Cake of Light of the esoteric Thelema new religion
- Conspiracy theory
- Human cannibalism
- Jewish deicide, the belief that Jews bear collective responsibility for the crucifixion of Jesus
- Kiddush § History of using white wine, practice in Judaism
- Moral panic, widespread feeling of fear
- OpIndia § Bihar human sacrifice claims
- QAnon § Child sex trafficking and satanic sacrifice conspiracy theory
- Salem witch trials (1692-93)
- Satanic ritual abuse, moral panic wave starting in the 1980s
- Sefer HaRazim, ancient Jewish magical text
- Statute of Kalisz, 13th-century Polish ducal decree offering Jews protection against blood libel, among others
