= Gavin I. Langmuir =

Canadian historian and medievalist

Gavin I. Langmuir (April 2, 1924 – July 10, 2005) was a Canadian medievalist historian. Much of his work focused on the Jews of medieval England and the history of antisemitism.

Veteran of World War II, a historian of antisemitism, and a medievalist at Stanford University.

== Life ==
Langmuir was born in Toronto. He initially planned a military career, and served as a lieutenant in the Canadian Army's Royal Highland Regiment during World War II. He saw service along the Siegfried Line from 1944–1945 until he was seriously wounded in battle February 1945. He received a medical discharge. With his military career ended, he decided to study diplomacy. He received a bachelor's degree from the University of Toronto in 1948 and then attended Harvard University to study modern diplomatic history. However, his interests shifted to medieval studies; in 1955 he completed his doctoral program with a dissertation on English constitutional history. He subsequently taught at Harvard and then at Stanford University.

Langmuir's friend James Given said that Langmuir's interest in the history of the Jews in medieval England originated in a book he reviewed. He wrote many academic articles and two books on the history of medieval Jews and anti-Semitism. He died in 2005.

== Works ==
Langmuir's research led to two books published in 1990:

- Toward a Definition of Antisemitism
- History, Religion and Antisemitism

Toward a Definition of Antisemitism (1990) drew a distinction between anti-Judaism, in which Christians opposed Jews based on their competing religion and belief system, with antisemitism, in which Christians hated Jews based on constructed stereotypes that cast Jews as inherently evil.

== Awards and appraisals ==
Langmuir's research received critical praise from many scholars:

- The New York Times Book Review noted, "The learning, passion and unflinching integrity Mr. Langmuir has devoted to unraveling the history of anti-Semitism show why he is a teacher of legendary reputation, as well as a scholar of high distinction."
- In 1991, History, Religion and Antisemitism was awarded the National Jewish Book Award in the scholarship category.
- Langmuir's academic peers also honored him by electing him a fellow of the Medieval Academy of America and of the Royal Historical Society in the United Kingdom.

In a book published in the year before Langmuir died, Christopher Browning attributes to him the concept of "xenophobic anti-Semitism," a socially motivated rather than religiously motivated attitude that according to Langmuir should be distinguished from a traditional hostility to Judaism that Christianity inherited from a long history of religious differences.
