= Jewish Historical Society of England =

The Jewish Historical Society of England (JHSE) was founded in 1893 by several Anglo-Jewish scholars, including Lucien Wolf, who became the society's first president. Early presidents of the JHSE included Hermann Adler, Michael Adler, Joseph Jacobs, Frederick David Mocatta, and Sir Isidore Spielmann.

The current President (as of 2020) is Miri Rubin. The society continues to promote research and education about the history of Judaism and Jewish life in England. Since 1982 it has published a journal entitled Jewish Historical Studies: A Journal of English-Speaking Jewry (originally entitled Transactions and Miscellanies which began in 1893).

== Former Presidents ==
Former presidents include Edgar Samuel, and Sir Isaiah Berlin.

== See also ==
- Anglo-Jewish studies
