= Westminster blood relic =

Medieval relic associated with Jesus of Nazareth

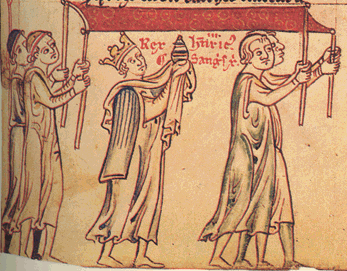
Henry III of England carrying the Relic of the Holy Blood at Westminster in 1247, by Matthew Paris

The Westminster blood relic was a medieval relic, said to contain some of the blood of Jesus Christ. It is distinct from the relic of the Precious Blood held in France.

The relic was sent from the Latin Patriarch of Jerusalem Robert of Nantes to Henry III of England in 1247, where it was then stored in the Church of the Holy Sepulchre in London, before being paraded through the streets by the King and buried in Westminster Abbey. Henry promoted the relic as a focus for pilgrimages, but it did not prove popular.

== Bibliography ==
- Vincent, Nicholas (2006). The Holy Blood: King Henry III and the Westminster Blood Relic. Cambridge, UK: Cambridge University Press. ISBN 9780521026604.
- Slack, Corliss K. (2013). Historical Dictionary of the Crusades. Scarecrow Press. ISBN 9780810878303.
