= Statute of Jewry =

1253 statute restricting Jews in England

The Statute of Jewry was a statute issued by Henry III of England in 1253. In response to widespread anti-Jewish sentiment, Henry attempted to segregate and debase England's Jews with oppressive laws which included imposing the wearing of a yellow Jewish badge to invite the Christian public's disdain.

== Context ==
English Jews were legally under the jurisdiction of the king, who offered them protection in return for their economic function. As "royal serfs", they were allowed freedom of the king's highways, exemption from tolls, the ability to hold land directly from the king, and physical protection in the vast network of royal castles built to assert Norman authority.

Usury, or lending money at interest, was forbidden to Christians of the era. Jews were prohibited from joining workmen's guilds, but were allowed to lend money at interest to non-Jews. The small number of Jews in England, a few thousand out of a total population over one million, thus served a valuable economic function, and were subject to high taxes at the king's discretion. The reputation of Jews as extortionate money-lenders arose, making them extremely unpopular with the Church and the general public.

== Articles ==
The statute had thirteen articles. They contained the following provisions:

- Article One provided that any Jew could remain in England only if he or she would "serve Us in some way".
- Article Two deemed that synagogues could not be constructed, and only those that existed in the time of King John could stand.
- Article Three demanded that Jews lower their voices in synagogues, so that Christians could not hear them.
- Article Four placed a duty on Jews to pay to their local Christian church.
- Article Five banned Christian (wet) nurses and servants working for Jews, and banned all Christians from eating with Jews or "abiding" with them in their houses.
- Article Six banned Jews from buying and eating meat during Lent.
- Article Seven banned Jews from disparaging or publicly disputing the Christian faith.
- Article Eight banned "secret familiarity" between Jewish men and Christian women, and Christian men and Jewish women.
- Article Nine commanded that "every Jew wear his badge conspicuously on his breast".
- Article Ten banned Jews from churches, except for 'transit'.
- Article Eleven barred Jews from hindering another's conversion.
- Article Twelve required Jews to obtain a license to live in any town other than those with established Jewish communities.
- Article Thirteen set out that the "justices of the Jews" were to enforce the articles, and that they were to be "rigorously observed on pain of forfeiture of the chattels of the said Jews".

== Bibliography ==
- Stacey, Robert C. (2003). "The English Jews Under Henry III: Historical, Literary and Archaeological Perspectives". In Skinner, Patricia (ed.). Jews in Medieval Britain. Woodbridge, UK: The Boydell Press. pp. 41–54. ISBN 9781843837336.
- Hillaby, Joe; Hillaby, Caroline (2013). The Palgrave Dictionary of Medieval Anglo-Jewish History. Basingstoke, UK: Palgrave Macmillan. ISBN 978-0-23027-816-5.
