= Katherine of England =

13th-century English princess

Katherine
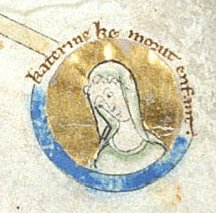
- An image of Katherine in a 14th-century illuminated manuscript
- Born: 25 November 1253; Westminster Palace, Westminster
- Died: 3 May 1257 (aged 3); Windsor Castle
- Burial: Westminster Abbey
- House: Plantagenet
- Father: Henry III of England
- Mother: Eleanor of Provence

Katherine of England (Old English: Katerine; 25 November 1253 – 3 May 1257) was the fifth child of Henry III and his wife, Eleanor of Provence. According to 13th-century chronicler Matthew Paris, when Katherine died she was deaf and may have had an intellectual disability, though it is unclear whether this is true. Some modern historians have theorised that Katherine alternately may have had a degenerative disease or a childhood illness; historians disagree on what disease or disability she may have had, or if she had one at all. She died when she was three years old. Her parents "celebrated her birth and commemorated her in death."

== Birth ==
Katherine was born early in the morning at Westminster Palace, Westminster, London. She was christened by the Archbishop of Canterbury, Boniface of Savoy, Katherine's maternal great-granduncle, who also stood as her godfather. She received the name Katherine because she was born on the feast of Saint Catherine of Alexandria. A few days after her christening, on the day of Saint Edward the Confessor's death, 5 January 1254, the king held a massive banquet, to which he invited all the nobility, including Emma le Despencer and her son, John. The provisions for this banquet included "fourteen wild boars, twenty-four swans, one hundred and thirty-five rabbits, two hundred and fifty partridges, fifty hares, two hundred and fifty wild ducks, sixteen hundred and fifty fowls, thirty-six female geese and sixty-one thousand eggs".

== Life ==
Soon after the banquet, the queen had to leave England and join her husband in Gascony, leaving the infant Katherine at Windsor Castle. The aforementioned Emma le Despencer was appointed governess and her aides were two wet nurses, Agnes and Avisa. The next year, the king and queen returned and the king ordered "gold clothes, with borders embroidered with the king's coat of arms", on 2 May 1255 for Katherine.

== Death ==
In the autumn of 1254, Katherine became gravely ill and was sent to Emma le Despencer's house in Swallowfield. She had few companions of her own age so the king sent one of his men into Windsor Great Park to capture a roe deer for his daughter to play with. The change seemed to benefit the sickly princess, and she was brought back to Windsor around or before February 1256. But, she had a relapse in late 1256. By the king's command, a report of her condition was sent to him by a special messenger during his expedition to France and when he heard of her convalescence he ordered that a "silver image made after the likeness of a woman" should be placed in Westminster Abbey as a votive offering, and the bearer of the news was given "a good robe". Katherine died on 3 May 1257. After her death, chronicler Matthew Paris described her as "the most beautiful girl, but mute and useless", which has raised the question of whether she had a disability throughout her life.

== Burial and legacy ==
Katherine was buried in the ambulatory in Westminster Abbey, in the space between the chapels of King Edward and St. Benet, close to the tomb of her uncle William de Valence. A splendid monument was raised to her memory by the king, rich with serpentine and mosaics, and surmounted by a silver image of his child. The Hermit of Charing was paid fifty shillings a year as long as he lived, that he might support a chaplain to pray daily at the Chapel of the Hermitage for the soul of Katherine; this was "a common aspect of Henry's commemoration of his deceased relatives".

After the death of Katherine, both Henry and Eleanor were heartbroken, the queen becoming sick with grief. They did not have any further children.

== Bibliography ==
- Armstrong, Abigail Sophie (2018). The Daughters of Henry III (PhD). Canterbury Christ Church University.
- Costain, Thomas B. (1994). The Magnificent Century. London: Buccaneer Books. p. 324. ISBN 978-1-56849-371-8.
- Badham, Sally; Oosterwijk, Sophie (2012). "The tomb monument of Katherine, daughter of Henry III and Eleanor of Provence (1253-7)". The Antiquaries Journal. 92: 169–196. doi:10.1017/s0003581512000078. S2CID 162927416.
