= Anglo-Jewish studies =

Anglo-Jewish studies is the field of historical enquiry into the experience of Jewish people in England. The Jewish Historical Society of England has been central to work in this area, which began as a serious field from around the 1880s.

== Historiography ==
Interest in the medieval Jewry of England was very limited until the twentieth century. The first published history was Anglia Judaica by De Blossiers Tovey in 1738, and no further serious efforts at investigating the topic were made until the end of the nineteenth century.

Unlike many areas of medieval historical research, the activities of the English Jewish community was in certain aspects extremely well documented, as a result of the interests of the crown in determining taxation and resolving disputes. This allowed research in the area to develop significantly, after the efforts of Jewish historians centred around the Jewish Historical Society, such as Joseph Jacobs, to produce accessible versions of key documents and analyse them in the late nineteenth and early twentieth century. Such work was still viewed as marginal to the wider study of English history. Within academia, there were serious barriers of anti-Semitism to the study of Jewish topics, Cecil Roth for instance noted in 1928 that the topic was "an outcast in Universities" and that until a career was assured, an academic "cannot dare to let it be known that he (sic) is seriously interested in questions relating to Jewish scholarship".

It continued to be viewed as a relatively marginal concern outside of Jewish studies until the 1940s, when the relevance and importance began to become more obvious in the light of Nazism and the Holocaust. Writers such as Roth developed these themes in A History of the Jews in England in 1941, utilising the work done by Jacobs and others to provide the documentary evidence. Henry Richardson produced further depth in his work English Jewry under Angevin Kings in 1960.

A new wave of historians in the 1970s picked up themes such as Barrie Dobson's work on the York Jewry, and Gavin Langmuir's work on ritual murder accusations regarding Little Saint Hugh. They understood their work as important for understanding the parallels with and roots of the Holocaust. For Dobson, "the treatment of their Jewish minorities by Edward I, Philip the Fair, and los reyes catolicos, much as those monarchs would have been disconcerted by the thought, is more 'relevant' to our own problems than any other feature of their respective reigns". Or as Langmuir says: "To explain what Hitler had done, scholars found they had to rewrite sections of earlier history".

More recently, a new wave of researchers has produced work focusing on the experience of individuals, gender history and other areas. It is flourishing as an area of medieval research, and has in Richard Huscroft's opinion become indispensable for medievalists to be familiar with.

Nevertheless, there has been continued reflection that general histories of the period still tend to neglect important aspects of period regarding the Anglo-Jewish community and anti-semitic measures or beliefs, despite being in Patricia Skinner's opinion "vital to an understanding of the political and social history of the region" and while other Anglo-Jewish historians believe general histories can underestimate the importance of the issues in a wider sense, while others believe the recent work often remains less accessible than it should be. The reasons for this are complex, but suggestions include that general histories often concentrate on individuals and their biographical details, hero worship of figures like Edward I, absorption of the prejudices of the primary sources, (Note: Richardson quotes Poole's volume III of the Oxford History of England: "The ostentation which possession of great wealth enabled the Jews to display, and their unconcealed contempt for the practices of Christianity, made them an object of universal dislike; as usurers, moreover, they had gained a strangle-hold on the recently-founded monastic houses whose splendid buildings they had financed, and on many of the smaller aristocratic families"; unchanged from the 1951 edition; still in print in the late 1980s) that the issues are too difficult, painful or embarrassing, or that the persecution of Jews by England's monarchs gives the lie to the notion that centralised power of Kings was to the general benefit of the population.

== Notable academics ==
- Joseph Jacobs
- Cecil Roth
- Edgar Samuel
- Barrie Dobson
- Gavin I. Langmuir

== See also ==
- History of the Jews in England
