= Gold penny =

Medieval English coin

Gold penny
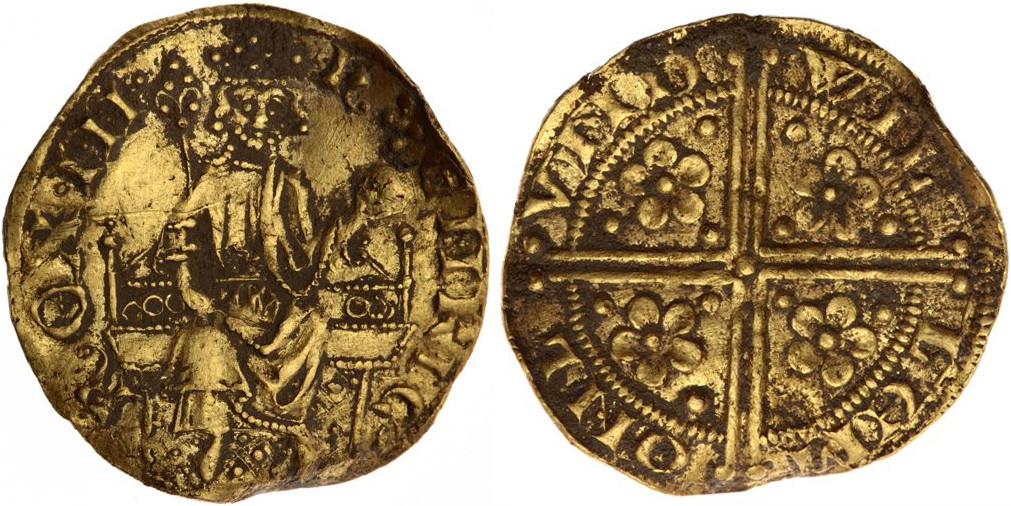
First side of the image: Obverse: Henry III upon throne holding orb and sceptre; inscribed HENRICUS REX III
Second side of the image: Reverse: cross with five-petal flower in each quarter; inscribed WILLEM ON LVND
AV 23 mm, 2.95 g. First coinage, 1257.

The gold penny was a medieval English coin with a value of twenty pence (i.e. 1/12 pound sterling), minted in 1257 during the reign of Henry III. The coin was short-lived as it quickly became undervalued, which led to its almost complete disappearance; only 8 examples are known to exist to this day.

== History ==
=== Need for higher value coins ===
Until the reign of King Henry III of England (1216–1272), any need in England for coins worth more than one penny, at the time a silver coin, was met by the use of Byzantine or Arabic gold and silver coins which circulated among merchants and traders. However, as commerce increased, so did the need for higher value coins. In 1257, Henry instructed his goldsmith, William of Gloucester, to produce a coinage of pure gold.

=== Introduction and use ===
The gold penny was introduced, with a value of twenty pence. The coin's obverse showed the king enthroned, in his royal attire, with a sceptre in his right hand and a globus cruciger in his left, with the legend HENRICUS REX III (King Henry III). The reverse contained a long cross extending to the edge, with a flower in each quarter, and the Moneyer's name in the legend, thus WILLEM ON LVND (William of London). Some examples read LVNDEN or LVNDE instead of LVND.

The gold penny was not popular. Thomas Carte, in his A general history of England, says that the citizens of London made a representation against them on 24 November 1257, and that "the King was so willing to oblige them, that he published a proclamation, declaring that nobody was obliged to take it (the gold penny), and whoever did, might bring it to his exchange, and receive there the value at which it had been made current, one halfpenny only being deducted from each, most probably for the expense of coinages".

=== Valuation and melting ===
Compared to its bullion weight, the coin was undervalued. By 1265, the gold in the coin was worth twenty-four pence rather than twenty, and it is believed that most of the coins were melted down for profit by individuals. Gold coins would not be minted again in England until the reign of King Edward III about seventy years later.

=== Disappearance ===
All known specimens of the gold penny were recalled and melted down, leading to the coin's disappearance and the eventual loss of knowledge regarding its existence. In the 18th century, historical records surfaced indicating that the coin had once been minted.It is believed that a small number of coins may have escaped destruction, possibly through accidental loss.

== Surviving examples ==
Eight examples are now known to survive. The most recent was discovered in September 2021 by amateur detectorist Michael Leigh-Mallory in a field in Hemyock, Devon. It sold at auction for £648,000 in January 2022.
