= Edgar Samuel =

Museum director and Jewish historian, England

Edgar Samuel (13 December 1928 – 9 January 2023) was the director of the London Jewish Museum from 1983 to 1995, before its move to Camden. He was President of the Jewish Historical Society of England in 1988. He was particularly known for his contribution to the history of Jewish Portuguese traders, but contributed to a large range of Anglo-Jewish research topics.

== Biography ==
Samuel was born in Hampstead, the eldest son of Wilfred Sampson Samuel and Viva Doreen, née Blashki. Samuel stated that his father acquired a professional standard of expertise as a researcher and writer, and made a significant contribution to the history of the Jewish community in England. Wilfred was the main founder of the Jewish Museum in London, and gathered together the nucleus of its collection.

Samuel attended school at Polak's House, Clifton College, Bristol. He qualified as a ophthalmic optician after school, and worked for 20 years in the profession.

Samuel followed in his father's footsteps, retraining as a historian. He studied for a BA (Hons) and an M Phil. In the early 1960s, using both his historical and optical skills, he developed a unique theory about the meaning of the skull in Holbein's painting The Ambassadors, in which he conjectured that it is designed to be viewed face on, through a simple, straight blown glass tube, acting as a lens. He made important documentary collections for Jewish genealogical research and the history of Decca.

Later he became a Fellow of the Royal Historical Society and worked as the director of the London Jewish Museum from 1983 to 1995, when it was located at Woburn House in Euston. He arranged for the transfer of the museum's collection to its current home in Camden Town, subsequently handing over the leadership of the museum to Rickie Burman. He was noted for the visual appeal of the exhibitions and displays at the museum.

His particular expertise was in the history of Jewish Portuguese traders.

He was active in the work of the Jewish Historical Society of England, initially joining his father on its council shortly after the end of the Second World War and serving on it for decades, becoming the president of the society in 1988 after serving as the chairman of its publications committee. He made substantial contributions to the society's Transactions. He was the chairman of Anglo-Jewish Archives, and was a member of the records and treasures committee of the Spanish and Portuguese Congregation, London.

== Samuel's theory regarding Holbein's The Ambassadors ==
Samuel's theory regarding The Ambassadors published in 1962–63 is that it was intended to be viewed through a special optic, rather than as generally believed, from the side.

The large distorted patch is visible from the side of the picture, and the consensus view is that the picture must have been intended to be viewed at an angle to expose this hidden skull.

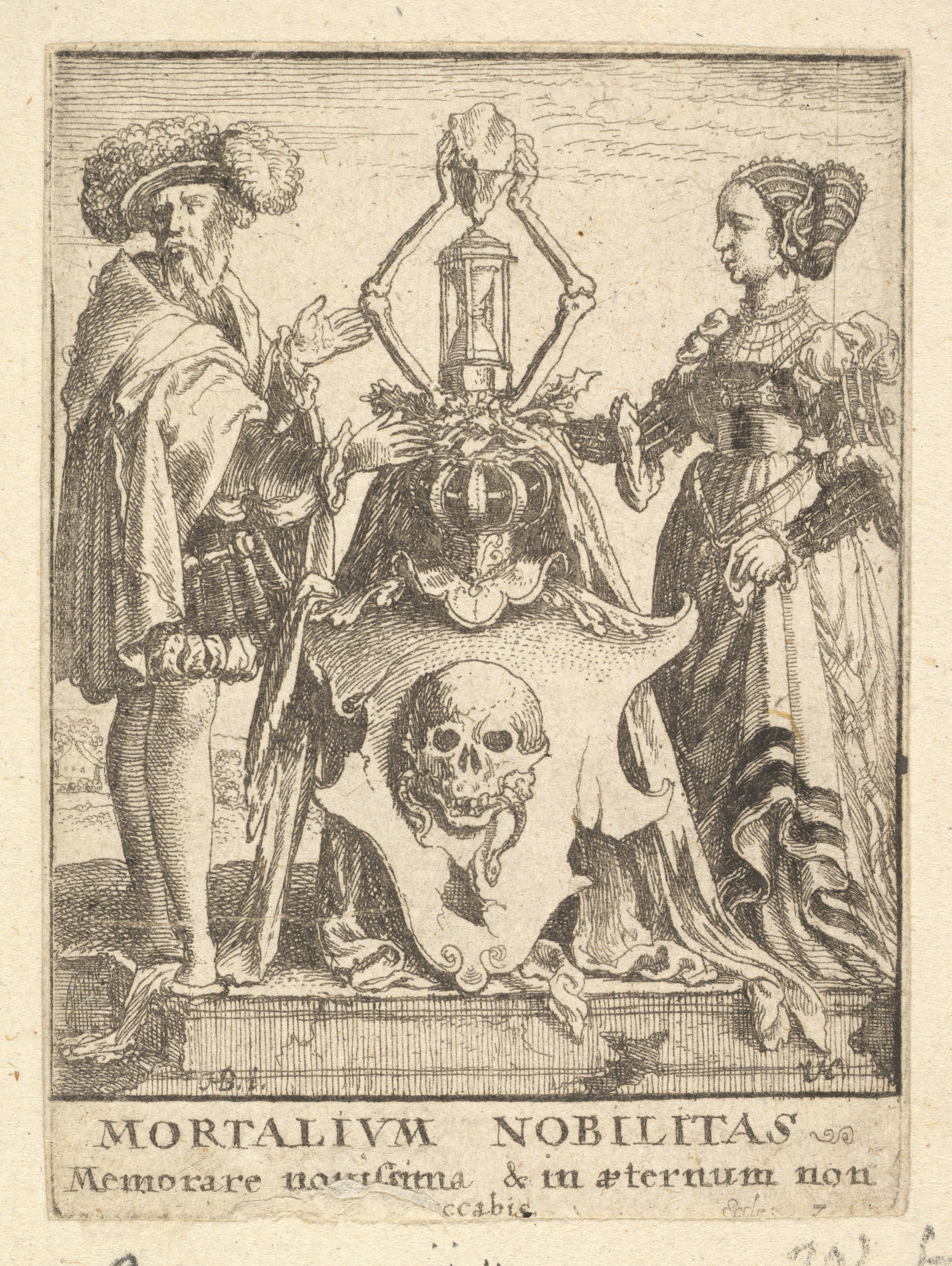
The Ambassadors' composition has often been compared with Holbein's Arms of Death.

Samuel noted that another painting at the Tudor court also used a viewing optic, recorded in 1602. He worked with the Warburg Institute and the British Optical Association, to establish how this may have been achieved. They ruled out complex optical devices, but identified that a simple, hollow glass tube would be able to produce the correct optical effects, and that such tubes were available and known at the time. To demonstrate the effect, he used a clear perspex tube of one foot length, one inch diameter and one eight of an inch thickness. He showed that it is possible to view the skull correctly from face on, using a perspex or glass tube optic at arm's length. This resolves the skull more realistically than when seen from the side, without the distortion that can be seen in the skull picture above. In Samuel's black and white image, it can be seen that the skull has more natural dimensions.

In his view, "the composition of the painting is altered for the better", as the skull, earth and celestial globes become suggestively aligned, and the tube points towards the left figure of De Dinteville, making him the focus of the painting. The line created by the tube balances with the distorted area, called an anamorphosis. The viewer sees the representatives of "wealth and power in state and church" at the "height of their powers", the tools of science and knowledge sit at the centre, and "in the glass, is the skull of death, at once a reminder of the transience of worldly glory, a brilliant demonstration of artistic skill and a fascinating scientific toy."

== Publications ==
His publications include:

- The Provenance of the Westminster Talmud in Transactions (1982)
- The Portuguese Jewish Community in London (1656–1830) in 1992
- At the End of the Earth: Essays on the History of the Jews of England and Portugal in 2004
- Death in the Glass – A New View of Holbein's 'Ambassadors' in 1963 in The Burlington Magazine
