= Battista dei Giudici =

Italian Dominican archbishop (1428/29–1484)

Battista dei Giudici (1428/29–1484), Latinized Baptista de Iudicibus de Finario, was an Italian Dominican who served as bishop of Ventimiglia, archbishop of Amalfi and archbishop of Patras.

== Life ==
Battista was the son of Lorenzo dei Giudici, a Ligurian nobleman, and was born in the Marquisate of Finale, in 1428 or 1429. He joined the Dominican Order at the age of 14, studying in the order's house in Bologna, San Domenico.

He received minor orders as a subdeacon on 19 June 1451, and was ordained priest in Bologna Cathedral on 25 February 1458. He was received as a student at the University of Bologna on 20 May 1458, graduated with a bachelor's degree in 1465, and was registered as a doctoral student by 19 October 1468.

Pope Paul II appointed him bishop of Ventimiglia on 22 April 1471, and under Pope Sixtus IV, he was appointed to the Roman curia. On 23 July 1475, Pope Sixtus appointed him apostolic commissioner in the case against the Jews of Trent, accused of having murdered Simon of Trent in March that year. He arrived in Trent in September, after the first sentences and executions had occurred. The local authorities worked against his investigation, preventing him from visiting Jews in prison and impeding his access to trial records. In the face of persistent hostility, he relocated to Rovereto, which was then under Venetian control.

When the defender of the Jews of Trent, the Paduan jurist Antonio Capodilista, appealed to him as the pope's representative, he managed to reopen the case in Rome. The prince-bishop of Trent, Johannes Hinderbach, had powerful friends in Rome, including the papal librarian Bartolomeo Sacchi, who blackened Giudici's name, accusing him of being in the pay of the Jews. Hinderbach himself had an account of the proceedings drawn up to vindicate his own actions, circulating it widely and so giving general credence to the notion that Simon of Trent had in fact been murdered by Jews. Giudici also wrote two treatises on the affair, an Apologia Iudaeorum defending the Jews, and an Invectiva contra Platinam defending himself. A committee of cardinals, chaired by Giovan Francesco Pavini, former professor of canon law at the University of Padua and an old friend of the bishop of Trent, exonerated Hinderbach and censured Giudici. A papal bull was issued on 20 June 1478, accepting that the inquiries in Trent had been carried out in legal fashion but avoiding a finding of fact with regard to Simon's death.

Giudici continued to act as a papal commissioner in other business, being sent to Benevento and then on a long mission to Castres, in the south of France. He was appointed archbishop of Amalfi on 26 April 1482, but remained in Rome. He preached funeral sermons for the condottiero Roberto Malatesta in St Peter's Basilica in September and for Guglielmo Rocca, archbishop of Salerno, in Santa Maria del Popolo in November 1482. He was appointed archbishop of Patras on 2 February 1484, but died before 15 April that year and was buried in Santa Maria sopra Minerva.

== Writings ==
- Serapion sive trialogus de contemptu mundi
- Apologia Iudaeorum
- Invectiva contra Platinam
- Litterae duae ad Iohannem Hinderbach
- Apologia traductionis antiquae libri Ethicorum Aristotelis contra invectivam traductionemque Leonardi Aretini
- Dialogus de migratione Petri Riarii s. Sixti cardinalis
- Oratio funebris pro Christophoro Rovere cardinali
- In funere clarissimi ac praestantissimi exercitus imperatoris Roberti Malatestae Ariminen. funebris oratio
