= Prozess gegen die Juden von Trient =

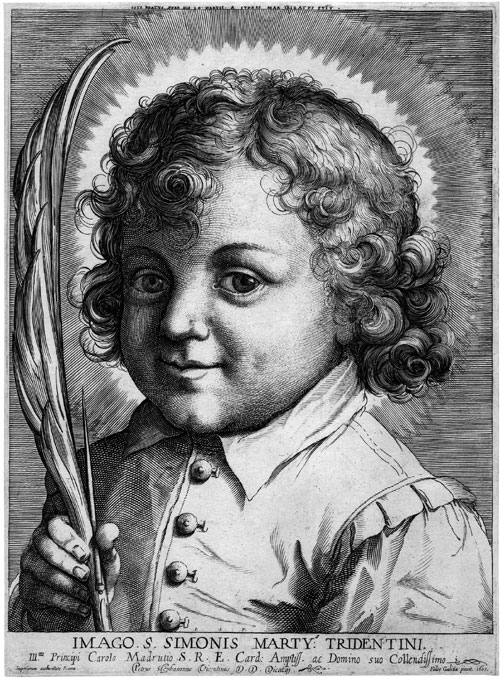
Simon of Trent; his murder in 1475 led to the trial of the Jews of Trent, which the Prozess describes.

The Prozess gegen die Juden von Trient, or Trial against the Jews of Trent, was an unpublished manuscript describing the trial and execution of 18 Jews from Trent, Italy, for the claimed murder of Simon of Trent in 1475. Commissioned in the 1470s, it came into the possession of a convent in Vienna in the 17th century and remained there until 1937, when it was purchased at auction by Lessing J. Rosenwald in order to avoid the document falling into the hands of the Nazis and being used to justify anti-semitism. After being sealed for 50 years, it was auctioned and now resides in Yeshiva University. The book consists of 614 folios and contains specific documents relating to the 1475 trial; it has been used as a source of scholarship in understanding the trial, despite difficulties in identifying the author and the variety of translation problems with the multiple languages used during the interrogation and trial itself, which are reflected in the Prozess.

== Origins and history ==
The Prozess was written some time between 20 June 1478 and 1479 as a commission by either Eberhard I, Duke of Württemberg or his brother-in-law, Francesco Gonzaga. Whoever was responsible for it, the work features the arms of the Dukes of Württemberg, and consists of 614 illuminated folios. In 1615, it was acquired by a convent in Vienna, where it remained until the Great Depression in the 1930s, when it was auctioned.

It came up for auction in December 1937, when it drew the attention of the Jewish-American businessman and bibliomane Lessing J. Rosenwald. Rosenwald was certain that, should the manuscript be obtained by the Nazi German administration, it would be used to justify anti-Semitism, and insisted that his auction agent spend whatever amount of money was necessary to secure it. This was done, with one of the outbid auction attendees later discovered to be an agent of the German government. As soon as the work arrived in the United States, Rosenwald shipped it to the American Jewish Historical Society, mandating that it be sealed and hidden for 50 years. When this time period expired, the Society auctioned the manuscript for $176,000 to Erica and Ludwig Jesselson, a pair of Jewish cultural collectors and patrons. The manuscript was then donated to Yeshiva University in 1988, where it remains. In 1992, it was used as a resource by R. Po-Chia Hsia, a European history professor, to author the book Trent 1475: Stories of a Ritual Murder Trial and contribute to scholarship around the trials in Trent.

== Contents ==
The subject of the Prozess is the "notorious fifteenth century criminal case" in which 18 members of the Jewish community of Trent were arrested for the murder of Simon of Trent and tortured until they falsely confessed: the men were then executed, and the women forced to convert to Christianity. The Prozess is not a complete copy of the trial proceedings, as it was commissioned during the campaign to secure Simon of Trent's status as a Catholic Saint; it contains only selected documents.

To legitimise the work, it begins with the papal bull of Pope Sixtus IV that validated the trial, translated into German. It then provides a chronological prologue, describing the disappearance of Simon, the discovery of the corpse and the first arrests, before focusing on the trial proceedings, particularly the interrogations. The author of the document is believed to be either Hans von Fundo, the scribe of the criminal court, or Peter Rauter of Malefarrat – identifying distinct voices and a particular author is rendered difficult by the variety of languages used during the interrogations, including German, Hebrew and Italian.

== Bibliography ==
- Basbanes, Nicholas A. (2012). A Gentle Madness: Bibliophiles, Bibliomanes, and the Eternal Passion for Books. Fine Book Press. ISBN 9780979949159.
- Hsia, R. Po-Chia (1992). Trent 1475: Stories of a Ritual Murder Trial. Yale University Press. ISBN 9780300068726.
