= Ariel Toaff =

Italian rabbi and historian (born 1942)

Ariel Toaff (Hebrew: אריאל טואף; born 17 July 1942) is an Italian historian of Jewry. He is a professor of Medieval and Renaissance History at Bar-Ilan University in Israel, whose work has focused on Jews and their history in Italy.

He came to international prominence with the 2007 publication of the first edition of his controversial book Pasque Di Sangue (Passovers of Blood), in which he claimed historical basis for ritual use of human blood. The claim was criticized as lending support to blood libel, an allegation that modern historians have described as unsupported by facts and which the Catholic Church has similarly repudiated since the 13th century. Toaff wrote that these critics had misunderstood his book, which argued that the ritual use of small quantities of dried blood in magical curses had been a real practice among medieval "Ashkenazi extremists", but that this was unrelated to the accusation of ritual murder which was the central claim of blood libel.

== Biography ==
Born in Ancona, Ariel Toaff is the son of Elio Toaff, late former Chief Rabbi of Rome.

Among his works are The Jews in Medieval Assisi 1305-1487: A social and economic history of a small Jewish community (1979); Love, Work and Death: Jewish Life in Medieval Umbria (Il vino e la carne. Una comunità ebraica nel Medioevo, 1989); Mostri giudei. L'immaginario ebraico dal Medioevo alla prima età moderna ("Jewish Monsters. The Jewish Imaginary from the Middle Ages to the Early Modern Era", 1996); and Mangiare alla giudia. La cucina ebraica in Italia dal Rinascimento all'età moderna (Eating Jewish style. Jewish Cooking in Italy from the Renaissance to the Modern Age, 2000).

=== Passovers of Blood ===
Toaff's book, Pasque di sangue. Ebrei d'Europa e omicidi rituali ("Passovers of Blood: The Jews of Europe and Ritual Murders"), was published in February 2007. The book analyzes the cultural and historical background to a notorious 1475 murder trial in Italy. A group of Jews were accused of murdering a young boy, later known as Simon of Trent, and using his blood for Passover rites. The accused were tortured and confessed to killing the boy, who was informally venerated as a saint by Catholics until the 1960s. The consensus of scholarship has dismissed cases such as Simon of Trent's as a blood libel against Jews.

The book's publication, among other responses, led to calls for Toaff to resign from or be fired from his professorship, and questioning of his research, historical method - which is based on the microhistory approach of scholars like Carlo Ginzburg - and motives as they relate to his writing of the book. Threats were made against his life, and some sought his prosecution.

The book was much criticized for providing material that anti-Semites might capitalize on, though Sergio Luzzatto praised his intellectual courage in reopening a dossier that had lain under a taboo. While Toaff framed his analysis in hypothetical language, and phrased his speculations in conditional language, the reception of the book often tended to translate this caution, according to Hanna Johnson, into the indicative language of accepted fact.

Toaff promised not to give in to pressure and defend his work "even if crucified". In response to a statement from Italian Jewish leaders that consumption or use of blood is prohibited by Jewish law and tradition, Toaff stressed that he was not implicating all Jews, but only "a group of fundamentalist Jews [who] did not respect the biblical prohibition [against use of blood]." However, Toaff did eventually pull his book from circulation. He clarified that in regard to the specific trial, dealing with Jews accused of killing Simon of Trent for ritual purposes at Passover, there was no relationship whatsoever between the so-called 'ritual of blood' and ritual infanticide. He denied that the Jews implicated were in any way involved in the murder of Simon. On February 14, 2007, Toaff said in a statement that he ordered the Italian publisher of his book to freeze distribution of his book so that he can "re-edit the passages which comprised the basis of the distortions and falsehoods that have been published in the media."

A second edition of the book appeared in February, 2008. In an afterword to this edition in defense of his book, Toaff responded to his critics. To forestall possible misinterpretations, he said that the idea that Jews practiced ritual murder is a slanderous stereotype, and that ritual homicide or infanticide was a myth. That said, the possibility existed that:

certain criminal acts, disguised as crude rituals, were indeed committed by extremist groups or by individuals demented by religious mania and blinded by desire for revenge against those considered responsible for their people’s sorrows and tragedies.

The evidence supporting this hypothesis draws on confessions extracted under torture. His book examines the strong documentary evidence in medieval medical handbooks that dried human blood, traded by both Jewish and Christian merchants, was thought to be medicinally efficacious. Under the stress of forced conversions, expulsions and massacres, Toaff thinks it possible that in certain Ashkenazi groups dried human blood came to play a magical role in calling down God's vengeance on Christians, the historic persecutors of the Jews, and that this reaction may have affected certain forms of ritual practice among a restricted number of Ashkenazi Jews during Passover.

== See also ==
- Kashrut

== Studies ==
- Sabina Loriga, "The Controversies over the Publication of Ariel Toaff's "Bloody Passovers"," Journal of The Historical Society, 8,4 (2008), 469–502.
