= Love, Work and Death =

1989 book by Ariel Toaff

- Author: Ariel Toaff
- Original title: Il vino e la carne
- Translator: Judith Landry
- Language: Italian
- Publisher: il Mulino
- Publication date: 1989
- Publication place: Italy
- English publication date: 1 June 1996
- Pages: 316
- ISBN: 8815020853

Love, Work and Death: Jewish Life in Medieval Umbria (Italian: Il vino e la carne. Una comunità ebraica nel Medioevo, lit. 'The Wine and the Meat: A Jewish Community in the Middle Ages') is a 1989 book by the Italian medievalist Ariel Toaff. It is about the establishment and everyday life of Jews in northern Italy in the second half of the 13th century.
