= Passovers of Blood =

Book by Ariel Toaff

Passovers of Blood: The Jews of Europe and Ritual Murders
- Author: Ariel Toaff
- Publication date: 2007

Passovers of Blood: The Jews of Europe and Ritual Murders (orig. lang. Pasque di sangue. Ebrei d'Europa e omicidi rituali) is a 2007 book by Israeli historian Ariel Toaff. The book examines the Simon of Trent case and the history of the blood libel, where Jews were accused of murdering a child for ritual purposes as part of Passover, as well as Jewish communities in northern Italy and the differences between Italian Jewish and Ashkenazi communities.

Its publication sparked controversy over reports that Toaff's research suggested that some Ashkenazi Jews may have engaged in ritual murder and the use of Christian blood. Toaff withdrew the book from circulation a week after its publication and republished it the following year with an afterword stating that there was no relationship between the use of dried blood in Jewish ritual and the alleged ritual murders underlying the blood libel.

== Contents ==
=== Chapter 1 ===
Toaff opens his book with a detailed vignette of the arrival in Venice from Rome of the philosemitic Holy Roman Emperor Friedrich III. It was his third visit to the city, and his arrival was met by an influx of numerous visitors, merchants, adventurers, clerics and relic-hawkers, all keen to obtain certificates attesting to their merits, services and learning. Among the various groups was a delegation of Ashkenazi Jews, leaders of a community that, over the preceding century, had emigrated in considerable numbers from German lands towards northern Italy where the expanding commercial empire of Venice offered prospects of prosperity and relief from the afflictions they had suffered in northern lands, in waves of antisemitic pogroms from the age of the Crusades to the Black Death.

Venice had in its employ a spy and intriguer, the Cretan adventurer and businessman David Mavrogonato, regarded as a malshin (moser) by the Jews of his native Heraklion, who was engaged in furthering Venetian interests in the Ottoman Empire's dominions in the Aegean. He, and his bodyguard and successor Salomone of Piove, enjoyed considerable privileges for services they rendered to the Council of Ten. Both attempted to employ Jewish physicians in an attempt to assassinate Mehmed II. The cameo role played by these two allows Toaff to touch on the politics of intrigue within the larger Jewish community. As Mavrogonato and Salomon of Piove acted on Venice's behalf to kill a Turkish Sultan, so one of Salomon's henchman, Salomon Fürstunger, connived with Pavia's powerful banker Mendele b.Abraham to get an Italian priest to assassinate by poisoning those responsible for the trial at Trento, over the case of Simon of Trent, which had led to the executions of many Jews in 1475.

In examining the condotte, pacts negotiated between Jewish leaders and the local authorities stipulating the duties and conditions under which the Jewish communities were given the rights of residency, Toaff elicits a significant difference in cultural values between the native Italian Jewish communities, and those hailing from the German-speaking world beyond the Alps. The Ashkenazi retained their deep suspicion of the Christian world which, in Germany, had caused them grievous injury, even within what was, at the time, the more hospitable world of northern Italy. In various agreements, they asked for and obtained strict guarantees from their hosts against forced conversion by friars and priests, the right to use kosher foods, the right to physical safety, severe punishments to be inflicted on any one who should harm them, and freedom from having their assets seized. Strict conditions were negotiated to govern the reliability of witnesses in the case of criminal charges being laid against them. They obtained the right to be allowed to follow their own religious observances with 'zealous scruple'. In some condotte, the authorities were asked, and consented to, expelling any Jews from the city (Gemona) who converted to Christianity.

Both groups competed as suppliers of credit, but the older Italian Jewish communities quickly lost out to the new Yiddish-speaking Ashkenazi, and were forced to close down their banking operations in many northern areas in consequence. Toaff describes entrepreneurs from these Ashkenazi communities as brash with the new power of the financial authority they had expeditiously acquired in a mere five decades after their arrival:-

'(They were) self-confident and often arrogant and insolent in their relationships with rulers, observing laws only when it was strictly necessary or too dangerous to act otherwise.'

=== Chapter 2 ===
Salomon of Piove's two sons, Marcuccio and Salamoncino, outshone their father in their rash adventurousness and bold wheeling and dealing. The first was distinguished for his braggart haughtiness - he was defined by Venetian authorities as fidelis noster civis, and was assured of that city's protection - sufficiently so to boast of taking on and beating any Christian who might prove bold enough to mess around with him. The other son, Salamoncino, took care of that grey area where shady business ventures and the criminal underworld rubbed elbows, attempting to assassinate Mehmed II, dealing in counterfeit goods and forbidden trade, and fleecing the Jews of Padova, rabbis, widows, students and the poor, of their savings. When his henchman David Schwab, hit by a cherem by a rabbinical victim, sought arbitration, Salamoncino hired an assassin to kill one of the other members of the swindling consortium, Aaron of Wil. The attempt failed, Salamoncino's role was discovered. He freely confessed to his Venetian protectors and was imprisoned for 6 months and banned for 4 years from Venice. After one more imbroglio he passes from history.

=== Chapter 3 ===
Tobias of Magdeburg, one of the doctors visiting Venice in search of a conferment of an imperial recognition from Frederick III in 1469, gave testimony linking the German Jews who had flocked to that city in the Emperor's train, with the figure of David Mavrogonato. According to his testimony at the Simon of Trent trial, Mavrogonato had imported, perhaps from Cyprus, large quantities of both sugar and blood for the Venetian market. Specifically, Tobias testified that the German Jews were keen to procure from the daring Cretan trader the blood of Christian children, not for confectioning rare medicines, but rather for obscure magical religious rites. Mavrogonato, wary of the dangers of direct involvement, delegated negotiations to a certain Hossar, i.e. Asher of Cologne, a charlatan known in Venice as el Zudio de la barba. According to further testimony by Israel Wolfgang, a double-dealing opportunist, powdered blood from Mavrogonato's shipment had been used in preparing the wine and unleavened bread for the Passover feast in Salomon of Piove's home, in 1471.

== Reception and reactions ==
Reactions to the book concentrated on the final chapter, which addressed the story of Simon of Trent, a young boy supposedly murdered by Jews in order to extract his blood to be used in making bread for Passover rituals. Roman Catholics commemorated Simon's martyrdom for five centuries, until, in 1965, the Vatican published Nostra aetate, which aimed at extirpating antisemitism from the Catholic faithful. The Bishop of Trent signed a decree proclaiming that the accusation against the Jews of that city was unfounded.

Shortly after its publication, press reports were circulated stating that Toaff claims in his book that there was some truth to the story, and that Christian children may have been killed by "a minority of fundamentalist Jews of Ashkenazi origin." Calls for Toaff to be prosecuted followed. In an interview with Haaretz Toaff said: "Over many dozens of pages I proved the centrality of blood on Passover," Toaff said. "Based on many sermons, I concluded that blood was used, especially by Ashkenazi Jews, and that there was a belief in the special curative powers of children's blood. It turns out that among the remedies of Ashkenazi Jews were powders made of blood." The article also states that: "Although the use of blood is prohibited by Jewish law, Toaff says he found proof of permission given by a highly restricted school of Ashkenazi rabbis to use blood, even human blood. 'The rabbis permitted it both because the blood was already dried, and because in Ashkenazi communities it was an accepted custom that took on the force of law.'"

Amos Luzzatto, former president of the Union of Italian Jewish Communities, has said, "I would expect a more serious statement than 'it might have been true.'" He also expressed dismay at the sensationalism with which Corriere della Sera, Italy's leading daily, treated the issue. A preliminary rebuttal, including interviews with Italian scholars, appeared on 11 February 2007 in the Italian newspaper Corriere della Sera. Twelve of Italy's chief rabbis in a press release refuting Toaff's claims declared: "It is totally inappropriate to utilize declarations extorted under torture centuries ago to reconstruct bizarre and devious historical theses." Kenneth Stow, Professor Emeritus of Jewish History at the University of Haifa, wrote: "To disparage this book is not, as some have suggested, to challenge academic freedom. It is to decry bad historiographical method."

Writing in the same newspaper, Prof. Ronnie Po-chia Hsia states: "There is plenty of evidence to suggest hatred between Jews and Christians, as many scholars have demonstrated regarding the Middle Ages. It is, however, quite a leap of imagination to take testimonies obtained under torture and to construct a hypothetical reality based on unrelated circumstantial facts. It may be true that dried blood or other exotic ingredients were used in popular medicine, Jewish or Gentile - not being an expert on the history of medicine, I remain open-minded on this; but it is sheer blind logic to jump to the conclusion that Jewish groups might have used Christian blood for ritual practices."

According to David Abulafia, Professor of Mediterranean History at the University of Cambridge, "... the significance of blood in Christian culture, and in particular the significance of the Eucharistic sacrifice, is largely ignored as an explanation of the fantasies, for such they were, about Passover rituals, fantasies in which the unleavened bread and wine became explicit negations of the body and blood of Christ. The blood libel has played a particularly nefarious role in the history of anti-Semitism."

== Withdrawal and republication ==
A week after its publication, Ariel Toaff withdrew the book from circulation, in order to "re-edit the passages which comprised the basis of the distortions and falsehoods that have been published in the media" The book was republished the following year. Toaff added an afterword, "Trials and Historical Methodology: In defence of Pasque di Sangue", in which he wrote,

I wish to specify that the principal aim of my research was to investigate the role of the so-called ‘blood culture’ in the German-speaking Jewish community, as in the Christian society that surrounded it. This was a manifold, therapeutic, magical, propitiatory, alchemic role which flouted the strict biblical and rabbinic prohibitions on the consumption of blood....But between this dried blood used in the rite – blood which originated from unknown ‘donors’, alive and well, and mostly belonging to indigent families – and alleged ritual murders there was no relationship whatsoever save in the minds of judges (and not only those of Trent) as they endeavoured to prove the blood accusation against the Jews. Through their tendentious interpretations, the magical, therapeutic, alchemic, propitious or maleficent use of blood served to give plausible support to the deadly blood libel.
