= Simon of Trent =

Italian child

Blessed Simon of Trent
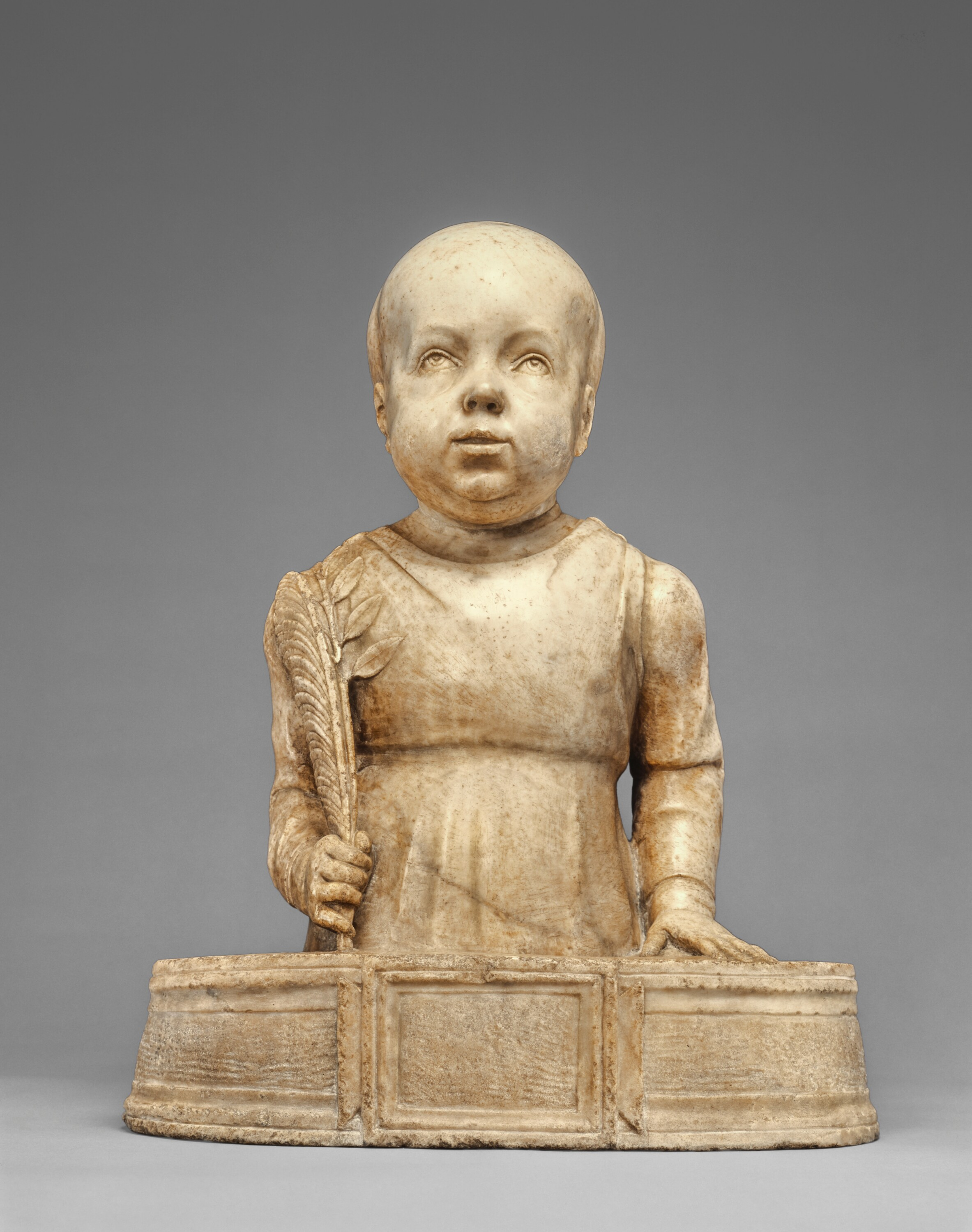
- Bust of Simon of Trent by Antonio Rizzo, previously attributed to Francesco Laurana, 1475-80, Getty Center.

Martyr
- Born: November 26, 1472; Trent, Prince-Bishopric of Trent, Holy Roman Empire
- Died: March 24, 1475 (aged 2); Trent, Prince-Bishopric of Trent, Holy Roman Empire
- Cause of death: unknown (ritual murder alleged)
- Venerated in: Catholic Church
- Beatified: 1588, Saint Peter's Basilica, Papal State by Pope Sixtus V
- Major shrine: Church of Saints Peter and Paul, Trento, Italy
- Feast: 24 March
- Attributes: Palm, laurel
- Catholic cult suppressed: 1965 by Pope Paul VI

Simon of Trent (Italian: Simonino di Trento; German: Simon von Trient, also known as Simon Unverdorben, 'Simon Immaculate'; 26 November 1472 – 24 March 1475), also known as Saint Simon (or Simeon) of Trent, was a young boy from the city of Trent, in the Prince-Bishopric of Trent (now Trentino, Italy), whose disappearance and death were weaponized as a blood libel against the city's Jewish community.

== Events ==
At the time of the events, Prince-Bishop Johannes Hinderbach reigned in Trent under the ultimate jurisdiction of Holy Roman Emperor Frederick III. In March 1475, an itinerant Franciscan preacher, Bernardine of Feltre, delivered a series of sermons in Trent that vilified the local Jews, essentially three households headed by Samuel (who arrived in 1461), Tobias, and Engel. They formed a distinct community marked by their professions and by their apparent wealth in comparison with the artisans and sharecroppers of the city: Samuel was a moneylender and Tobias a physician. The Prince-Bishop had renewed the Jewish community's permission to reside and practice their professions in Trent a few years previously, in 1469. This dependence on the protection of the authorities later inclined the Jews, upon finding Simon's body, to report the discovery.

The events themselves have been reconstructed from a careful study of the trial records by American historian Ronnie Hsia. Simon, almost two and a half years old, went missing about 5 p.m. on the evening of Thursday, 23 March 1475. The following day, Good Friday, Simon's father approached the prince-bishop to ask for help in finding his missing child. The podestà, Giovanni de Salis, had his men spread a description of Simon through the city. Over the following couple of days, searches were carried out by Simon's family and neighbours, by the servants of the podestà, and also by the Jewish community, who had been alerted to a rumour that they had taken the child and were concerned about the possibility of being framed. On Saturday, 25 March, Simon's father appealed to the podestà specifically to search the Jews' houses, saying he had been advised they might have taken his child. Despite these searches, no sign of the child was found. Samuel's property was extensive, including a hall that functioned as a synagogue, and a water cellar that was also used for ritual bathing and was supplied with water from a channel that ran beneath the property. According to the trial record, on Easter Sunday, 26 March, a cook named Seligman went to Samuel's cellar to fetch water to prepare the evening meal and found Simon's body in the water. Samuel himself, accompanied by two other Jews, went to the podestà to report the discovery. Later that evening, the podestà and some of his men retrieved the body, with his servant Ulrich being ordered to carry it to the hospital. The narrative summary based on the trial documents, drafted in 1478–1479, omitted the fact that the Jews had themselves reported finding the body, stating instead that Ulrich had found Simon's body in a ditch next to Samuel's house.

Following the report of the body's discovery, the entire Jewish community (both men and women) were arrested and forced under torture to confess to having murdered Simon to use his blood for ritual purposes (a classic example of the blood libel that Jews used Christian blood in their rituals). An examination of the corpse by city doctors determined that Simon had not died of natural causes but had been exsanguinated. In Hsia's view, "the narrative imperative, the official story of ritual murder, the trial record of 1475–76, represents nothing less than a Christian ethnography of Jewish rites".

Fifteen of the Jews, including Samuel, the head of the community, were sentenced to death and burnt at the stake. The Jewish women were accused as accomplices but argued because of their sex they were not allowed to participate in the rituals restricted to men. They were freed from prison in 1478 due to papal intervention. One Jew, Israel, was allowed to convert to Christianity for a short while, but he was arrested again after other Jews confessed he was part of the Passover Seder. After a long period of torture he was also sentenced to death on 19 January. The Trent trial's notoriety inspired a rise in Christian violence towards Jews in the surrounding areas of Veneto, Lombardy, and Tyrol, along with accusations of ritual murder, culminating in Vicenza with the prohibition of Jewish moneylending in 1479 and the expulsion of all Jews in 1486.

== Papal investigation ==
On 3 August 1475, Pope Sixtus IV commanded Bishop Hinderbach to suspend judicial proceedings until the arrival of the papal representative, Battista dei Giudici, Bishop of Ventimiglia, who would conduct a joint investigation with the Bishop of Trent. Giudici arrived in Trent in September. The local authorities worked against his investigation, preventing him from visiting Jews in prison and impeding his access to trial records.

In the face of persistent hostility, he relocated to Rovereto, which was then under Venetian control, and summoned Hinderbach and the podestà to answer for their conduct. Instead of appearing, Hinderbach had an account of the proceedings drawn up to vindicate his own actions, circulating it widely and so giving general credence to the notion that Simon of Trent had in fact been murdered by Jews.

The case was reviewed in Rome, where Hinderbach had powerful friends, including the papal librarian Bartolomeo Sacchi, who accused Giudici of being in the pay of the Jews. Giudici wrote two treatises on the affair, an Apologia Iudaeorum defending the Jews, and an Invectiva contra Platinam (aimed at Sacchi) defending himself. A committee of cardinals, chaired by Giovan Francesco Pavini, former professor of canon law at the University of Padua and an old friend of the bishop of Trent, exonerated Hinderbach and censured Giudici. A papal bull was issued on 20 June 1478, accepting that the inquiries in Trent had been carried out in legal fashion but avoiding a finding of fact with regard to Simon's death, while also reasserting papal protection for the Jews and the unlawfulness of ritual murder trials, in line with a decree of Pope Innocent IV from 1243.

== Veneration ==
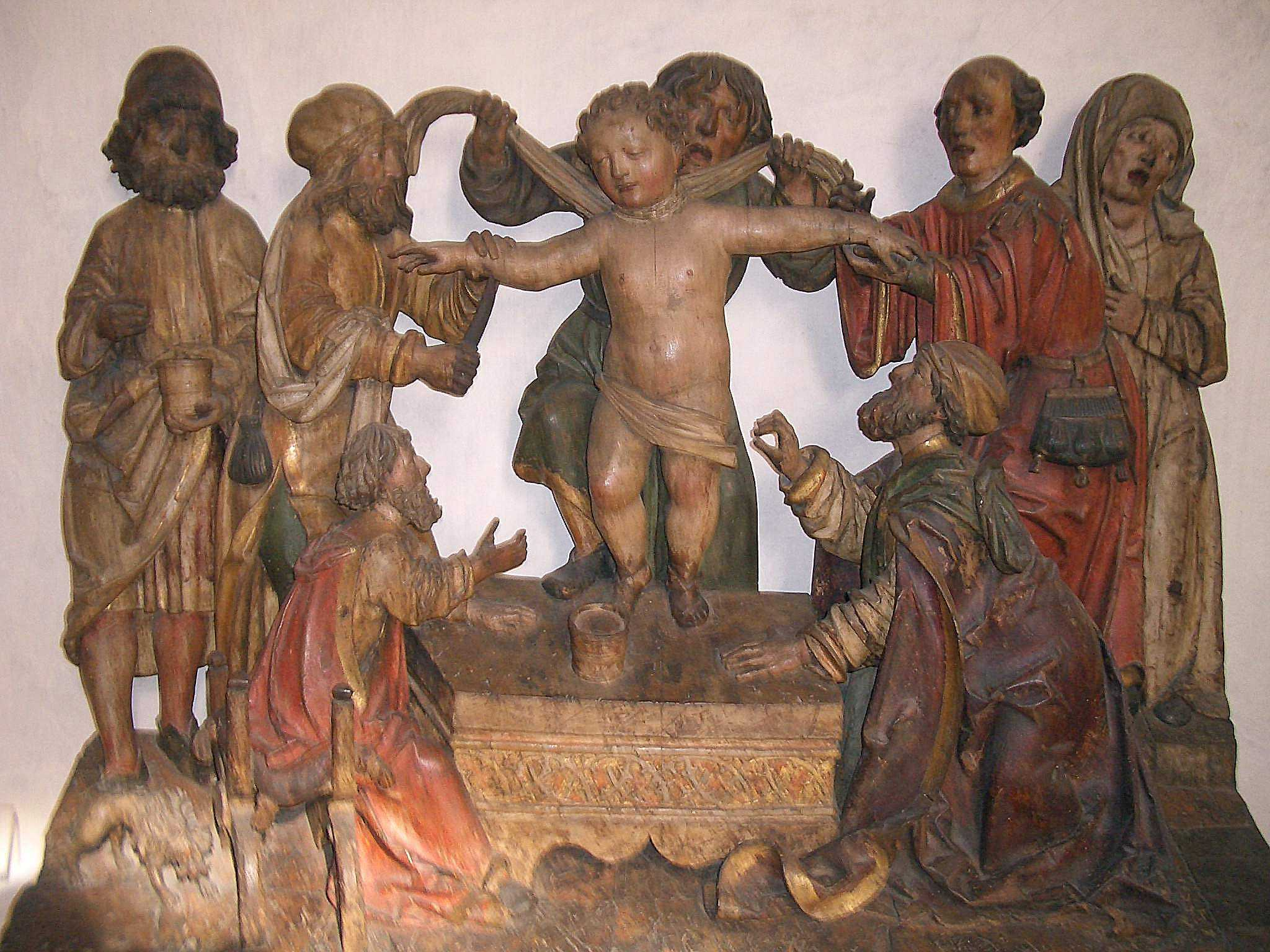
School of Niklaus Weckmann, The Martyrdom of Saint Simonino

Simon became the focus of attention for the local Catholic Church. The local bishop, Hinderbach of Trent, tried to have Simon canonized, producing a large body of documentation of the event and its aftermath. Over one hundred miracles were attributed to Simon within a year of his disappearance, and his cult spread across Italy, Austria and Germany. However, there was also skepticism from the beginning, as Giudici's investigation showed.

Maximilian I, a future Holy Roman Emperor, was a strong proponent of Simon's veneration and commissioned a silver monument of the child. He also had Simon's relics carried in procession when he was made emperor in 1508.

The veneration received wider liturgical impetus in the 16th century. Joannes Molanus included a footnote on Simon of Trent in his 1568 edition of Usuard's martyrology, and this was then incorporated into the new official edition of the Martyrologium Romanum in 1583, with 24 March having the additional text: Tridenti passio sancti Simeonis pueri, a Judaeis saevissime trucidati, qui multis postea miraculis coruscavit. ("At Trent, the suffering of the holy boy Simeon, barbarously murdered by the Jews, who was afterwards glorified by many miracles.") In 1584 the use of this martyrology became obligatory in the Roman Rite. Furthermore, in 1588 Pope Sixtus V gave recognition to the local veneration of Simon as an established devotion, functionally equivalent to a decree of beatification.

In 1758, Cardinal Ganganelli (later Pope Clement XIV, 1769–1774) prepared a legal memorandum which, to the exclusion of all other allegations of ritual murders of infants the records of which were thoroughly made available to him, expressly admitted as proven only two: that of Simon of Trent and that of Andreas Oxner. At the same time, he extolled the glories and accomplishments of the Jewish people across history, writing that the murder of Simon of Trent did not suffice to injure the reputation of the entire Jewish people.

Simon's cultus was permitted by the Popes for local public liturgical observance (effectively beatification) within the Diocese of Trent. In a letter to Benedetto Veterani, Promoter of Faith, Pope Benedict XIV recognised that this was the case, but was careful to distinguish such authorization from canonization.

In 1914 Herbert Thurston wrote in the Jesuit periodical The Month, in "protest against the extraordinary perversity with which so many anti-Semitist journalists — not a few of them, we are sorry to say, Catholics — persist in thinking evil of their Jewish fellow-countrymen":

It is simply untrue to say that the Church has canonized little Simon of Trent. A decree of beatification was issued by Sixtus V, which took the form simply of a confirmation of cultus and which allowed a Mass to be said locally in honour of the boy martyr. Everyone knows that beatification differs from canonization in this, that in the former case the infallibility of the Holy See is not involved, in the latter it is.

Following studies on the case, on 28 October 1965 (the same day as the publication of Nostra aetate by Pope Paul VI) archbishop of Trent Alessandro Maria Gottardi abolished the cult of Simon, and the yearly procession with his relics was suppressed. Simon of Trent is not in the new Roman Martyrology of 2000, nor on any modern Catholic calendar. His relics, removed from their resting place in Saints Peter and Paul church in Trent upon the cult's suppression, were returned there in 2021, together with an exhibit about him curated by the Museo diocesano tridentino.

== Controversies ==
In the 21st century, historian Ariel Toaff, writing about the case of Simon of Trent, hypothesized that the notion that some Jews killed children to use their blood for ritual purposes may have been tenuously based on an actual "ritual of blood" that did not involve infanticide. In the same work, Passovers of Blood, Toaff theorises that some blood libel cases may be based on actual instances of infanticide where a Jewish perpetrator acted in retaliation for persecutions against the community. After criticism, the book was withdrawn from circulation and redacted by its author.

In 2020, the Italian artist Giovanni Gasparro painted a depiction of Simon's death. He was later accused of antisemitism for this painting which was sold to a private collector.

In February 2022, a sculpture of Simon of Trent depicting the blood libel was used by QAnon conspiracy theorists to promote the conspiracy theory that Hollywood elites are harvesting adrenochrome from children through Satanic ritual abuse in order to become immortal.

== Image gallery ==
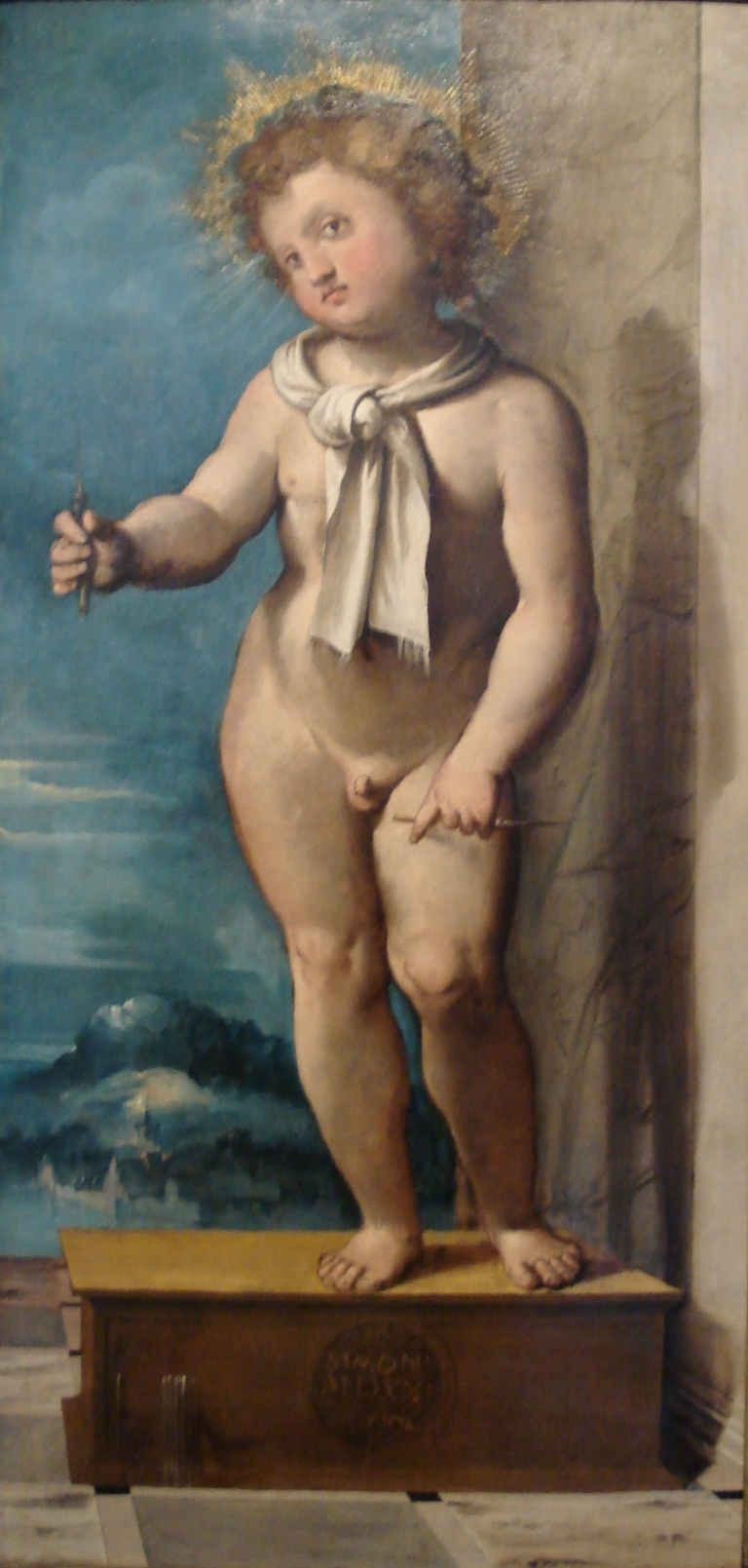
Altobello Melone, Simon of Trent, ca.1521, oil on panel, Castello del Buonconsiglio, Trent (Italy)

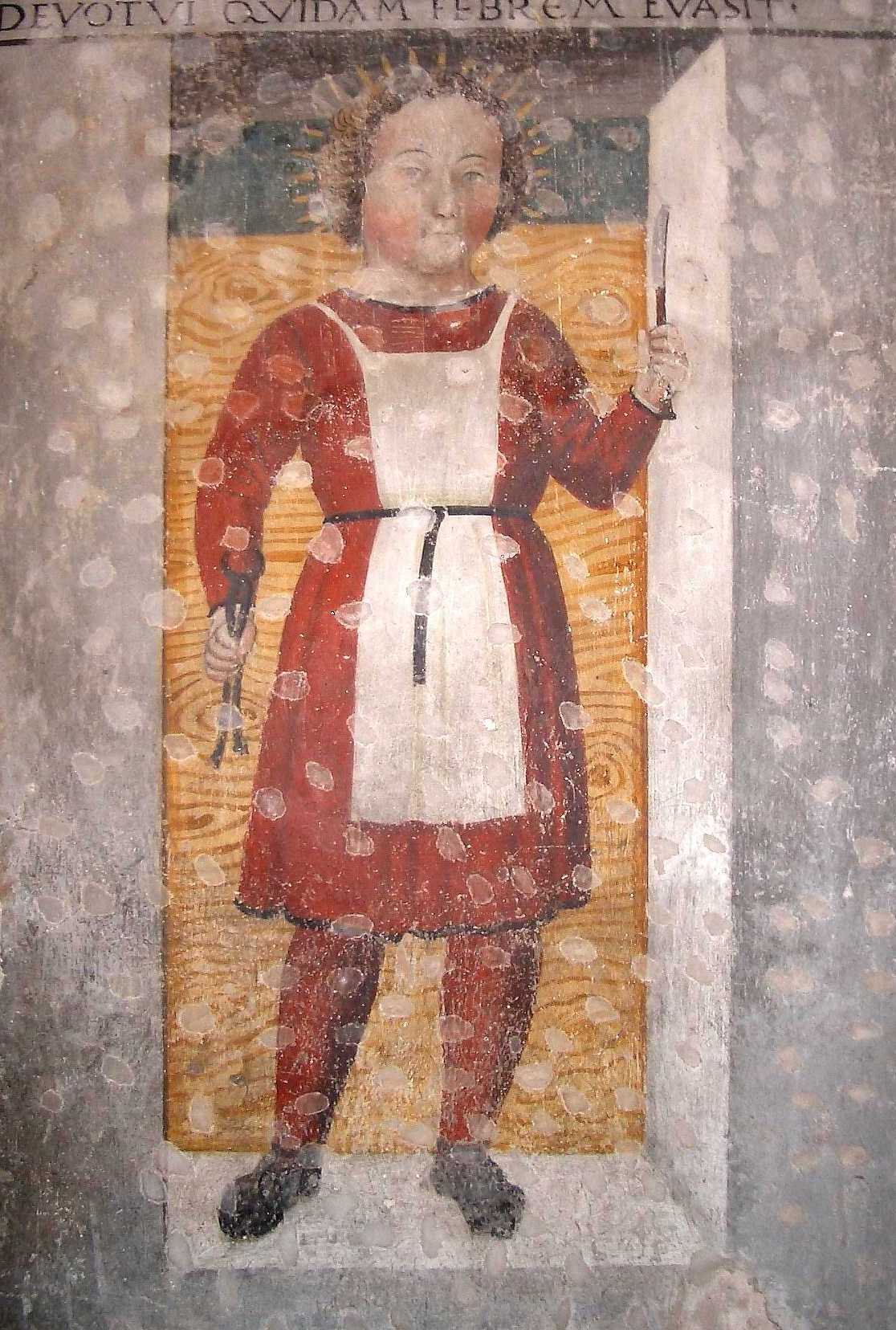
Unknown painter, Ex voto; fresco, end of the 15th century, church of Santa Maria Annunciata, Bienno (BS), Italy

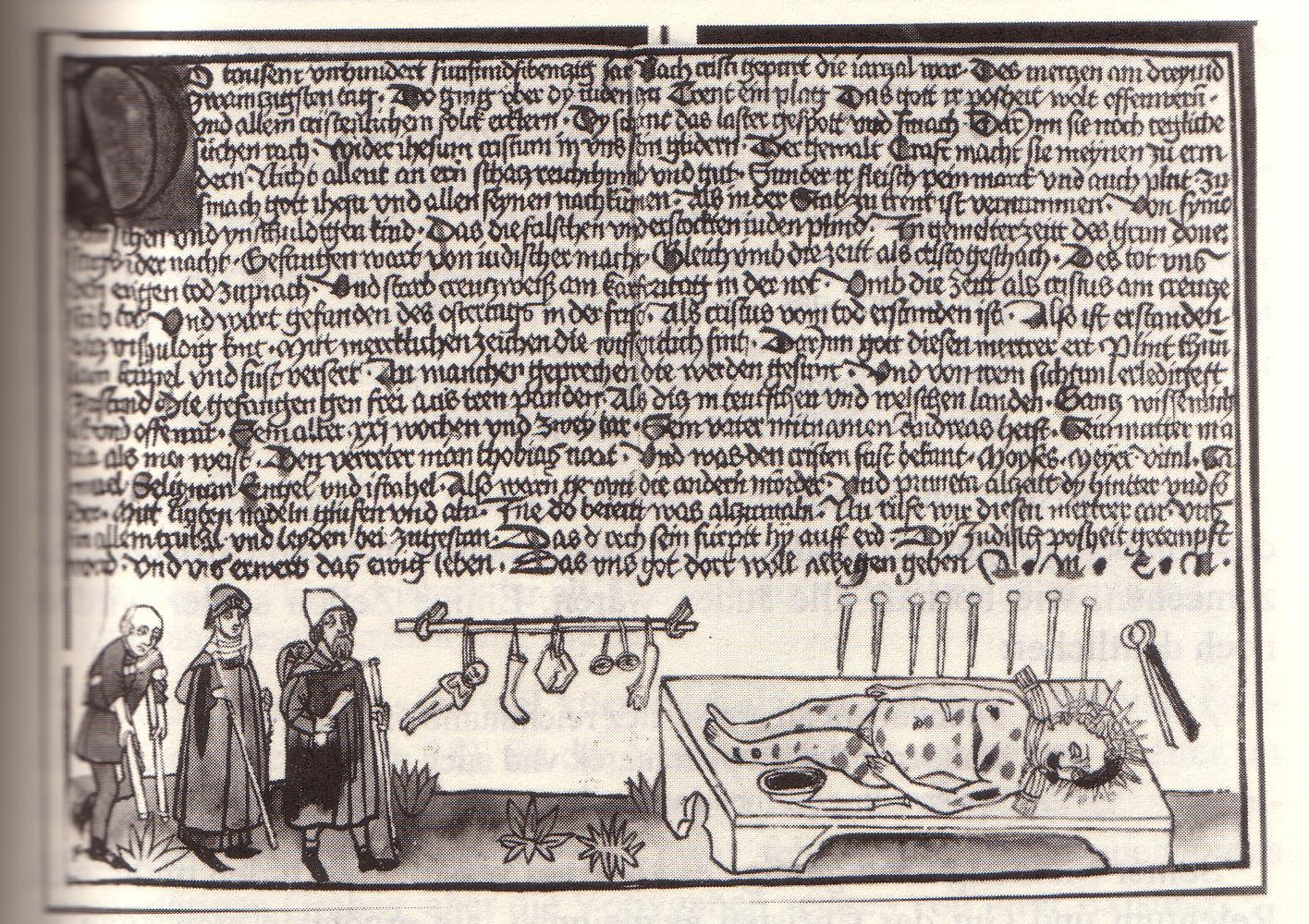
Incunabulum of Friedrich Creussner, Nuremberg, 1475

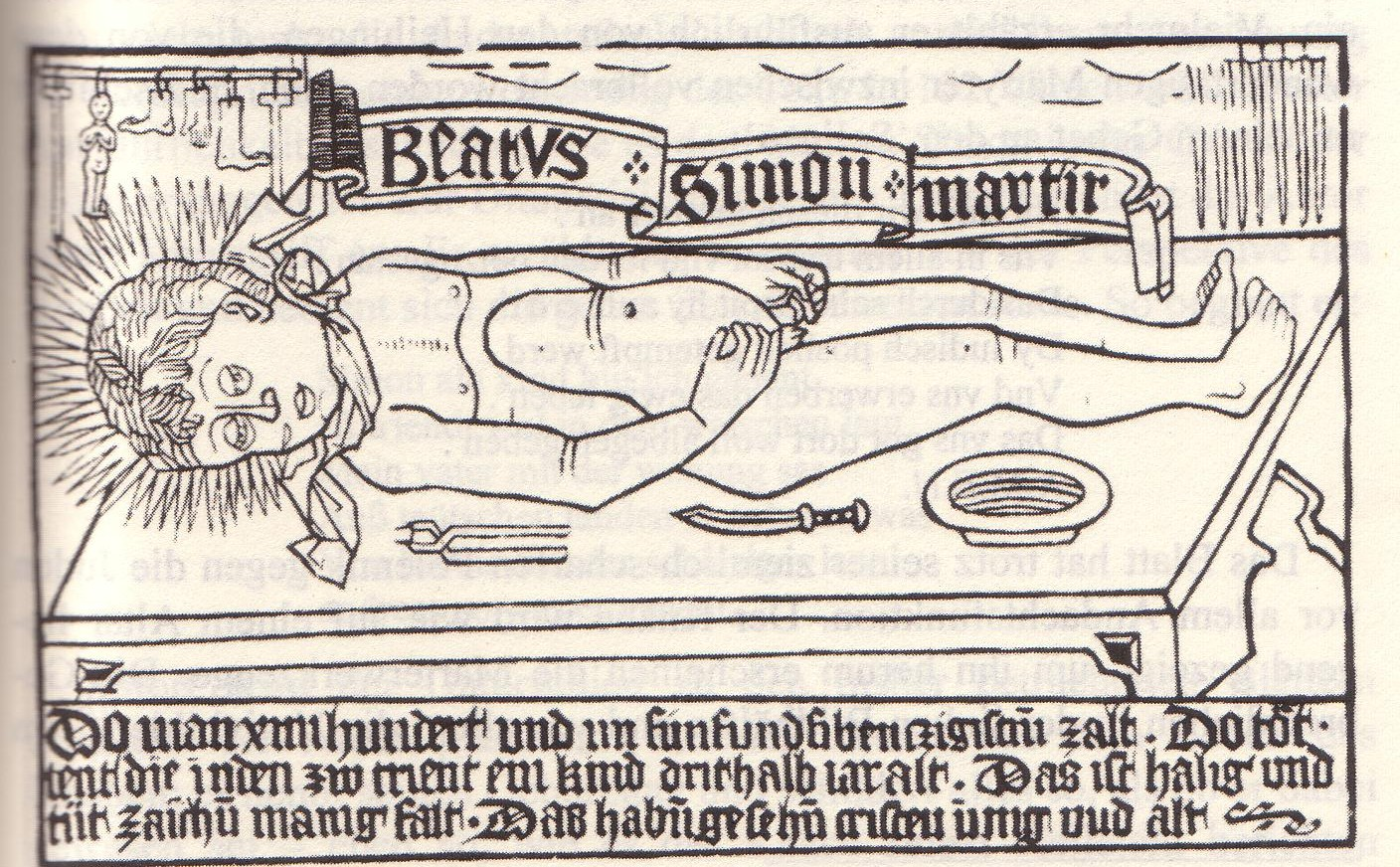
Simon of Trent's martyred body. Engraving, Nürnberg, around 1479.

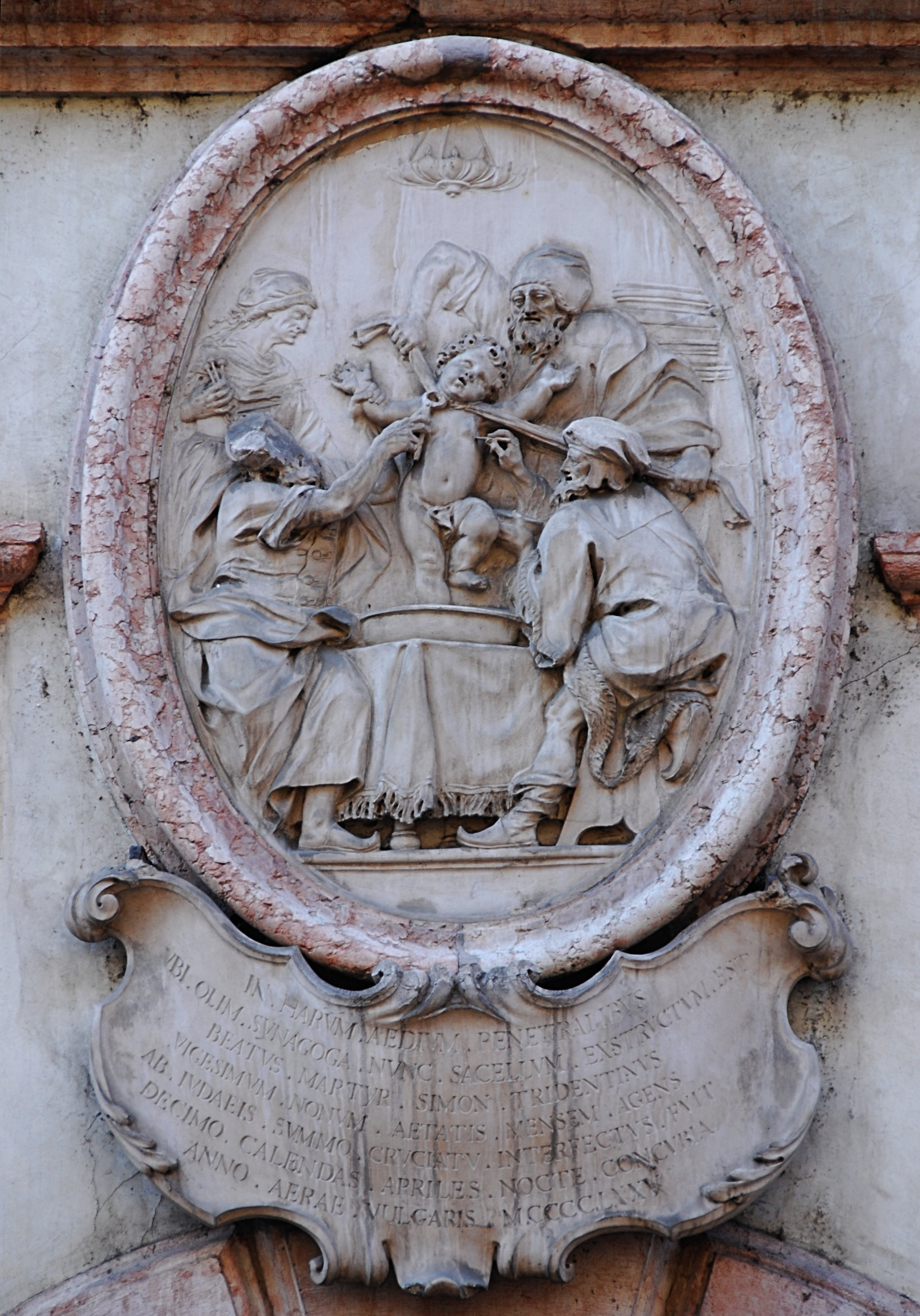
Stone medallion with the purported martyrdom scene of Simonino di Trento. Palazzo Salvadori, Trent

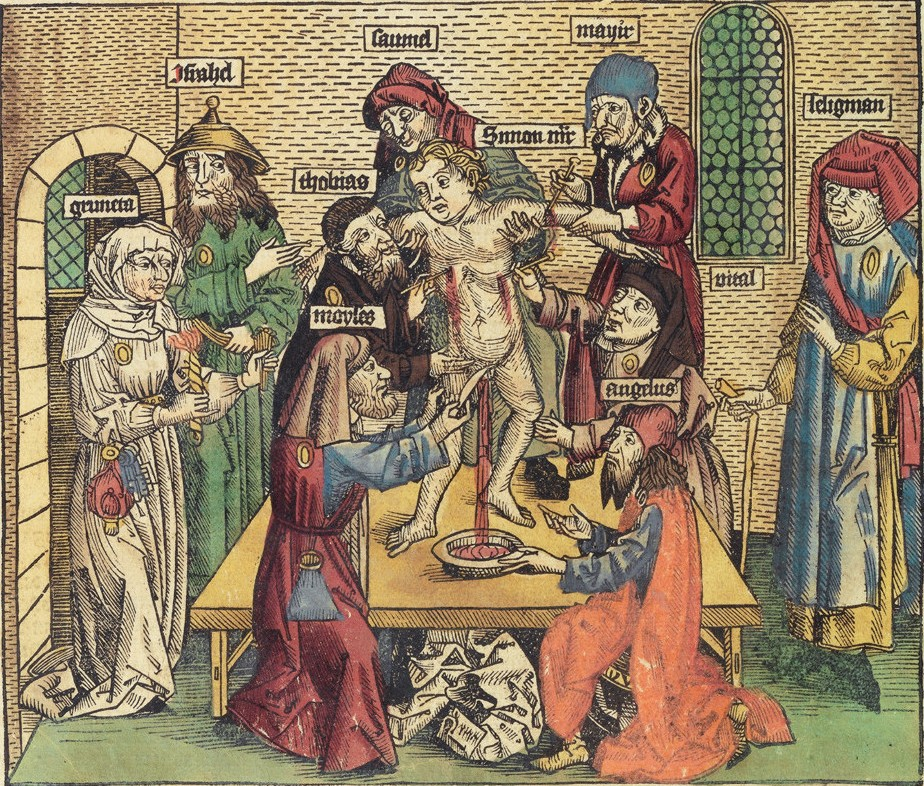
Illustration in Hartmann Schedel's Weltchronik, 1493

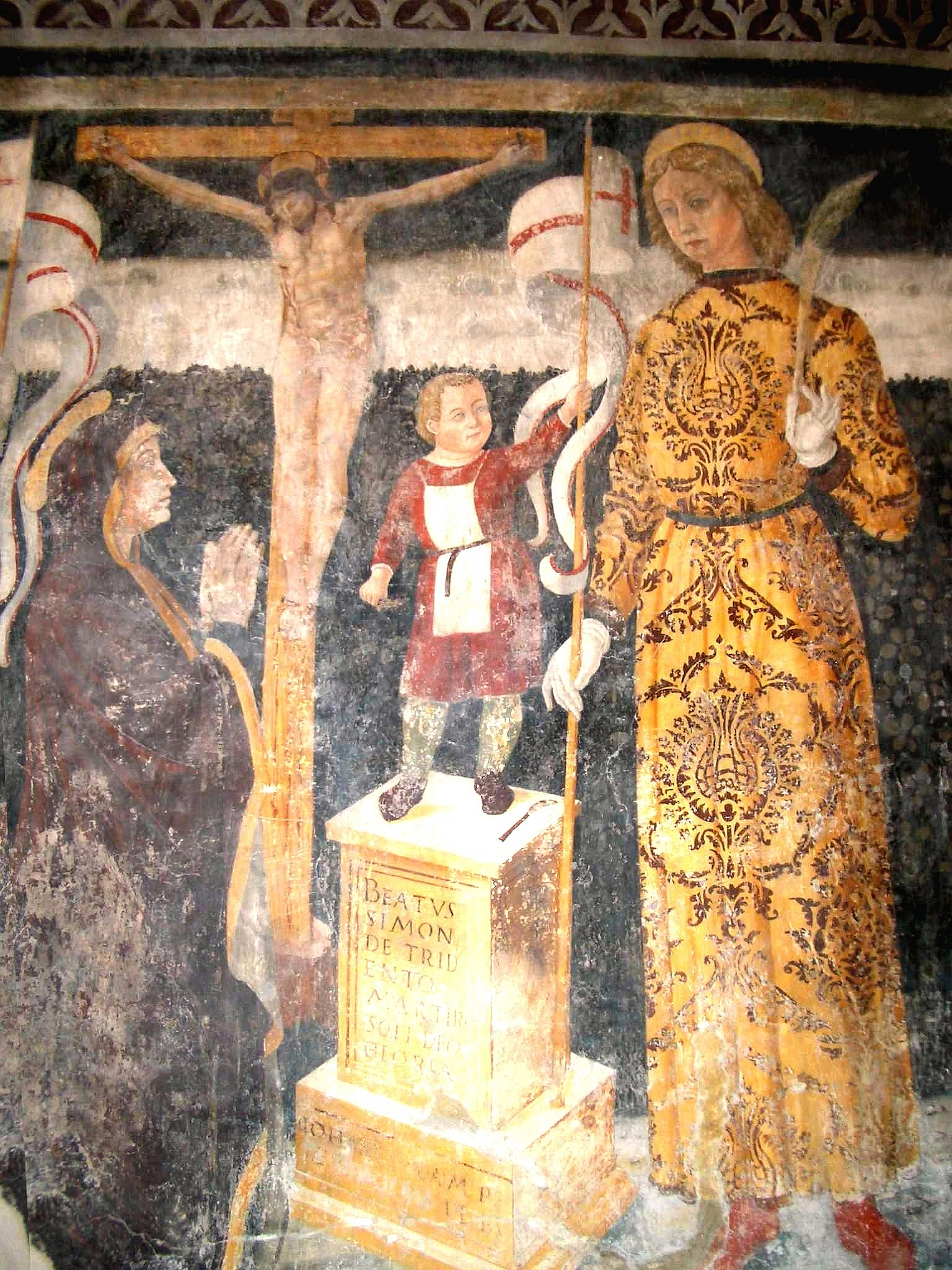
Unknown painter, fresco, end of the 15th century, church of Santa Maria Annunciata, Bienno (BS), Italy

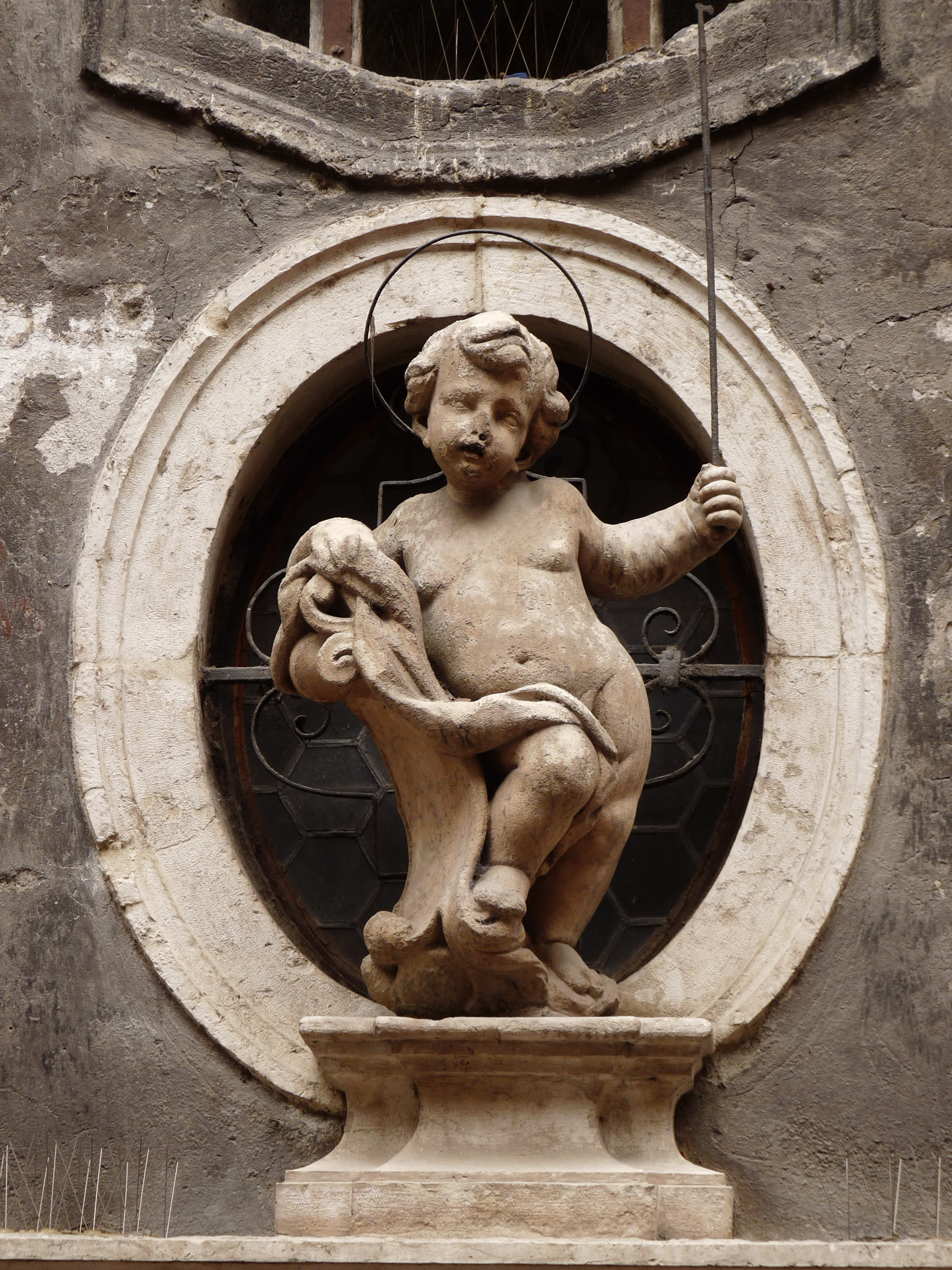
Statue of Simon of Trent on the facade of a palace in Trento (situated in "Via del Simonino")

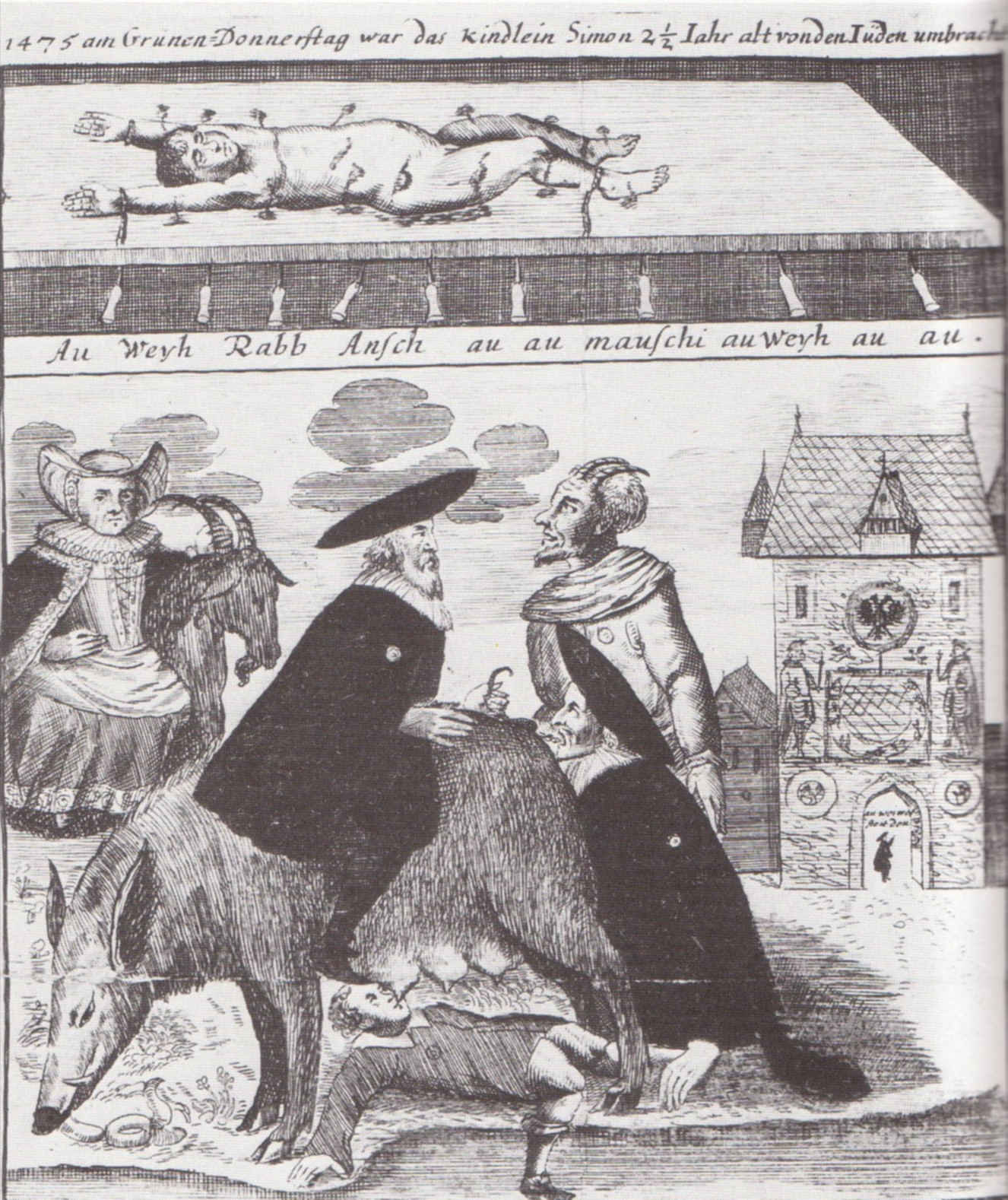
Martyrdom of Simon of Trent above a Judensau in Frankfurt.

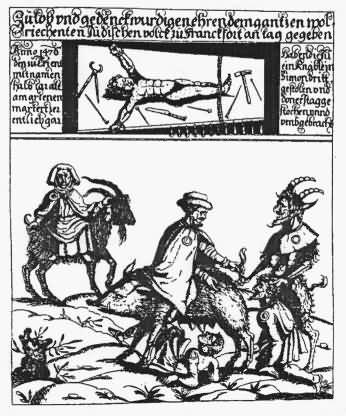
Martyrdom of Simon of Trent above a Judensau in Frankfurt.

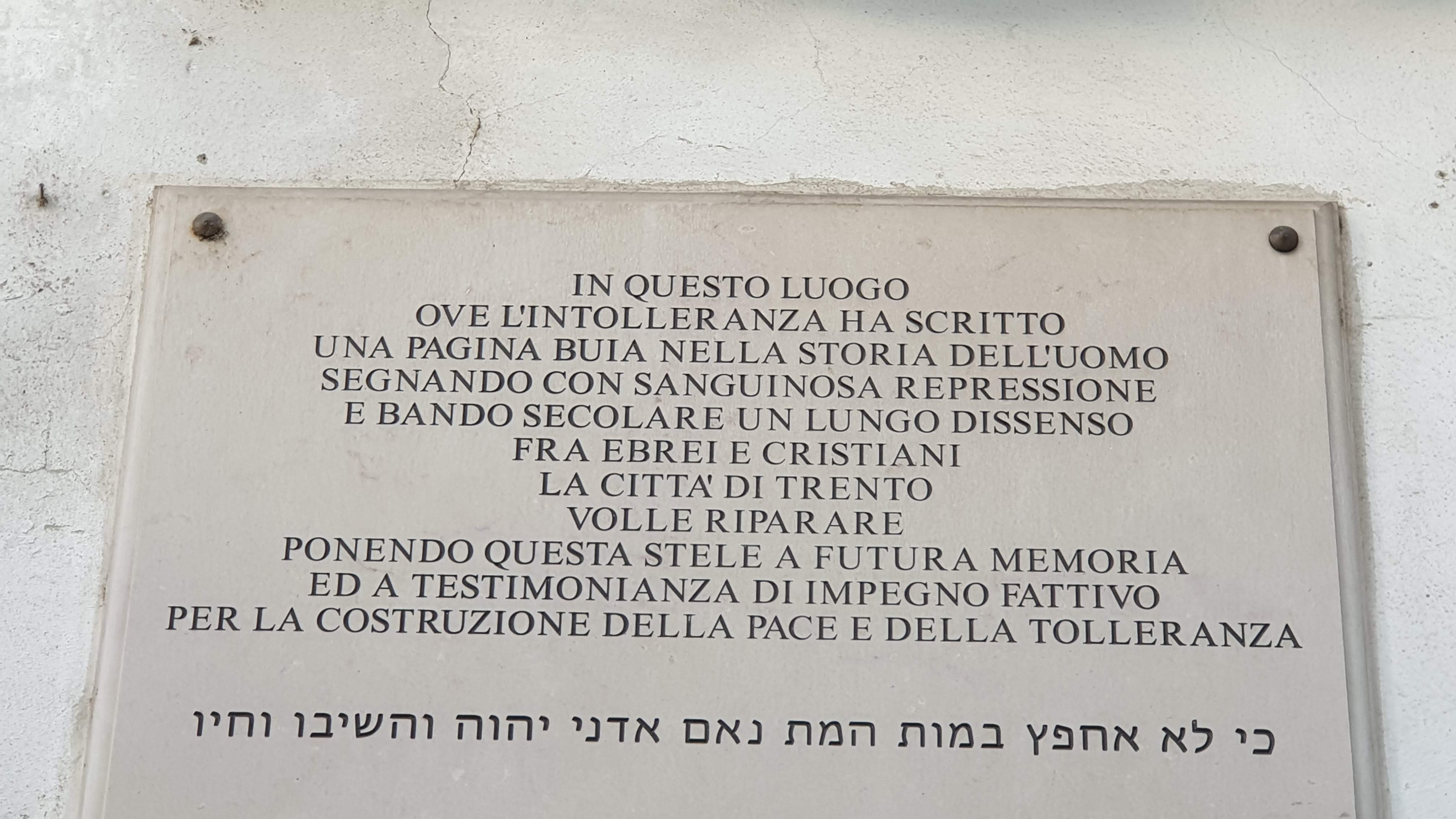
Plaque in Trento commemorating the injustice towards Jews.

== See also ==
- Little Saint Hugh of Lincoln
- William of Norwich
- Werner of Oberwesel
- Robert of Bury
- Harold of Gloucester
- Prozess gegen die Juden von Trient
- Raphael Levy
