= Johannes Hinderbach =

German catholic bishop

- Prince-Bishop of Trent
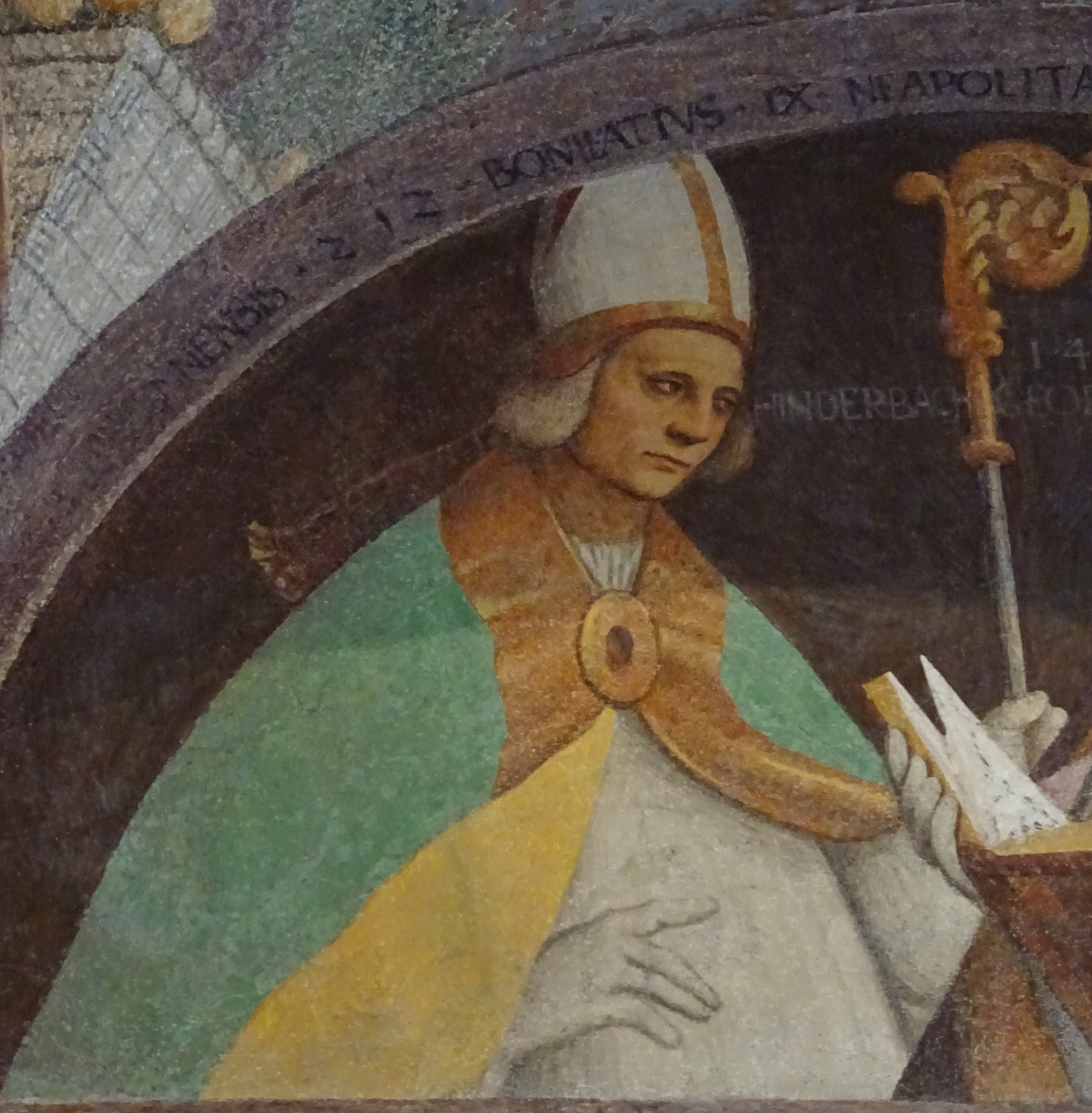
- Elected: 30 August 1465
- Installed: 12 May 1466
- Term ended: 21 September 1486
- Predecessor: Georg Hack von Themeswald
- Successor: Ulrich von Frundsberg

Personal details
- Born: 15 August 1418 Rauschenberg, Hesse
- Died: 21 September 1486 (aged 68) Trento

Johannes Hinderbach (15 August 1418 – 21 September 1486) was Prince-Bishop of Trent from 12 May 1466 until his death. He was by birth a member of the Austrian nobility. Prior to his appointment as Bishop, he served as an advisor to the court of Fredrick III.

He was notable for his involvement in the case of Simon of Trent, a young boy who was found murdered in 1475; Hinderbach blamed the local Jews for his death (see blood libel), executed fifteen of them, and promoted Simon's canonisation as a saint.

The only remnant of Hinderbach's tomb is a still existing memorial slab, exhibited at the Museo Diocesano Tridentino.

Preceded by George II Hack von Themeswald; Until 1465	Bishop of Trento; 1466–1486	Succeeded by Ulrich III von Frundsberg
