= British literature =

Literature written in or related to the United Kingdom

British literature is a body of literature from the United Kingdom of Great Britain and Northern Ireland, the Isle of Man, and the Channel Islands. This article covers British literature in the English language. Anglo-Saxon (Old English) literature is included, and there is some discussion of Anglo-Latin and Anglo-Norman literature, where literature in these languages relate to the early development of the English language and literature. There is also some brief discussion of major figures who wrote in Scots, but the main discussion is in the various Scottish literature articles.

The article Literature in the other languages of Britain focuses on the literatures written in the other languages that are, and have been, used in Britain. There are also articles on these various literatures: Latin literature in Britain, Anglo-Norman, Cornish, Guernésiais, Jèrriais, Latin, Manx, Scottish Gaelic, Welsh, etc.

Irish writers have played an important part in the development of literature in England and Scotland, but though the whole of Ireland was politically part of the United Kingdom from January 1801 to December 1922, it can be controversial to describe Irish literature as British. For some this includes works by authors from Northern Ireland.

The United Kingdom publishes more books per capita than any other country in the world.

== British identity ==
The nature of British identity has changed over time. The island that contains England, Scotland, and Wales has been known as Britain from the time of the Roman Pliny the Elder (c. 23 AD–79). English as the national language had its beginnings with the Anglo-Saxon invasion which started around AD 450. Before that, the inhabitants mainly spoke various Celtic languages. The various constituent parts of the present United Kingdom joined at different times. Wales was annexed by the Kingdom of England under the Acts of Union of 1536 and 1542. However, it was not until 1707 with a treaty between England and Scotland that the Kingdom of Great Britain came into existence. This merged in January 1801 with the Kingdom of Ireland to form the United Kingdom of Great Britain and Ireland. Subsequently, Irish nationalism led to the partition of the island of Ireland in 1922; thus the literature of the Republic of Ireland is not British, although literature from Northern Ireland is both Irish and British. In 1927 the Royal and Parliamentary Titles Act 1927 formally changing the name of the UK to the United Kingdom of Great Britain and Northern Ireland. Until fairly recent times Celtic languages continued to be spoken widely in Scotland, Wales, Cornwall, and Ireland, and these languages still survive, especially in parts of Wales.

Works written in the English language by Welsh writers, especially if their subject matter relates to Wales, has been recognised as a distinctive entity since the 20th century. The need for a separate identity for this kind of writing arose because of the parallel development of modern Welsh-language literature.

Because Britain was a colonial power the use of English spread through the world; from the 19th century or earlier in the United States, and later in other former colonies, major writers in English began to appear beyond the boundaries of Britain and Ireland; later these included Nobel laureates.

== The coming of the Anglo-Saxons: 449–c.1066 ==
=== The other languages of early Britain ===
Although the Romans withdrew from Britain in the early 5th century, Latin literature, mostly ecclesiastical, continued to be written, including Chronicles by Bede (672/3–735), Historia ecclesiastica gentis Anglorum; and Gildas (c. 500–570), De Excidio et Conquestu Britanniae.

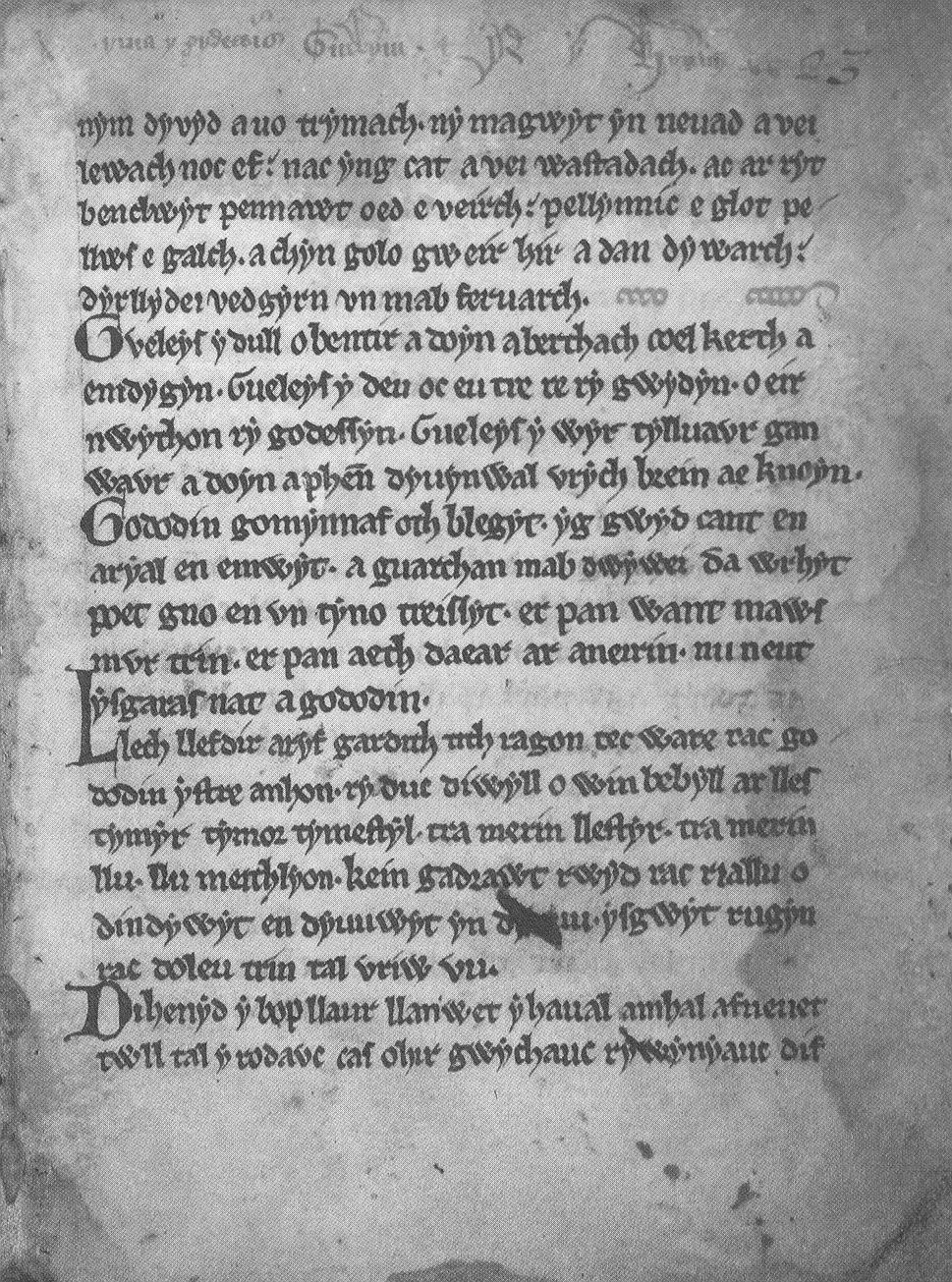
A facsimile page of Y Gododdin c. 1275

Various Celtic languages were spoken by many British people at that time. Among the more important written works that have survived are Y Gododdin and the Mabinogion. From the 8th to the 15th centuries, Vikings and Norse settlers and their descendants colonised parts of what is now modern Scotland. Some Old Norse poetry survives relating to this period, including the Orkneyinga saga, an historical narrative of the history of the Orkney Islands, from its capture by the Norwegian king in the 9th century until about 1200.

=== Old English literature: c. 658–1100 ===
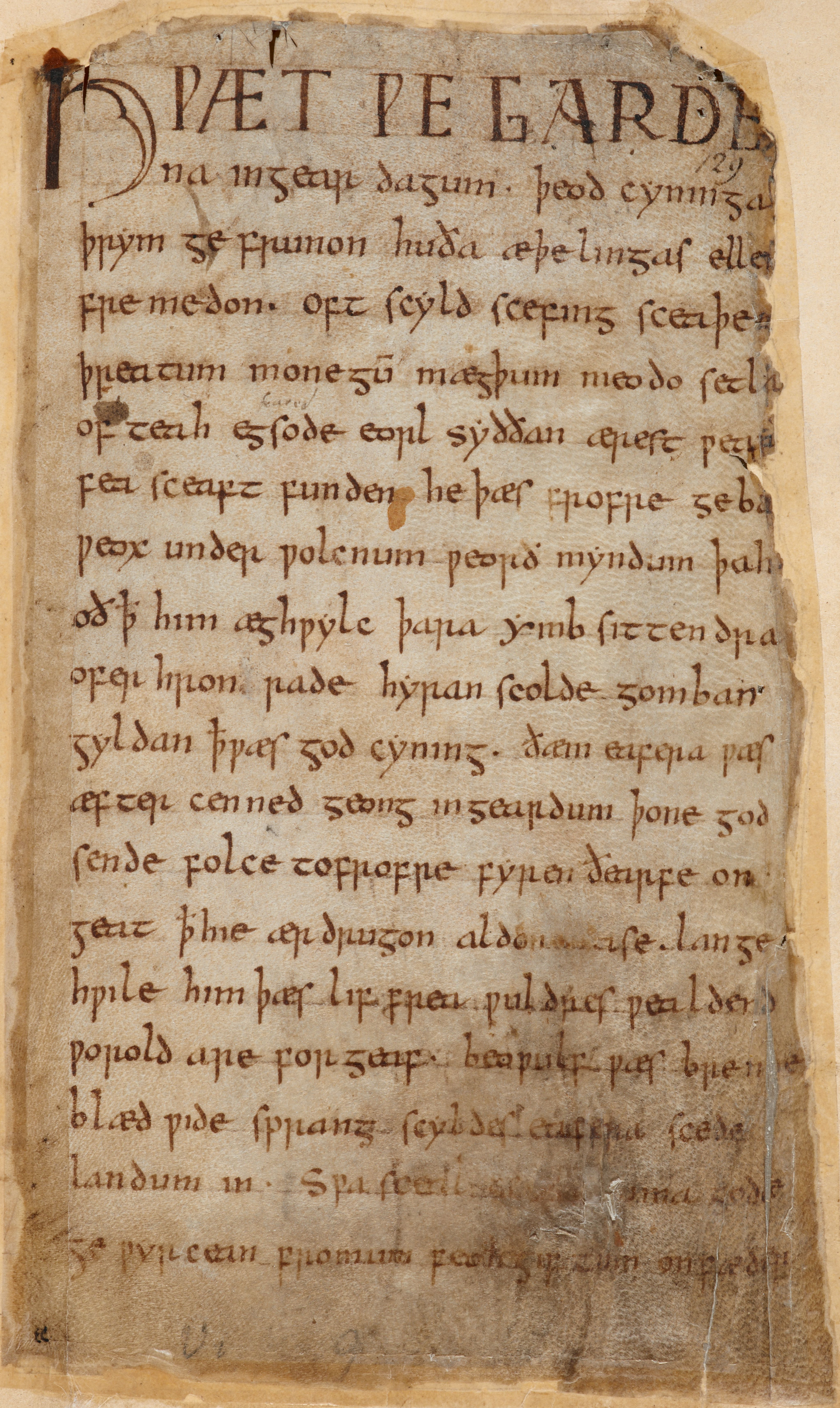
First page facsimile of Beowulf

Old English literature, or Anglo-Saxon literature, encompasses the surviving literature written in Old English in Anglo-Saxon England, from the settlement of the Saxons and other Germanic tribes in England (Jutes and the Angles) around 450, until "soon after the Norman Conquest" in 1066; that is, c. 1100–50. These works include genres such as epic poetry, hagiography, sermons, Bible translations, legal works, chronicles, riddles, and others. In all. there are about 400 surviving manuscripts from the period.

Oral tradition was very strong in early English culture and most literary works were written to be performed. Epic poems were thus very popular, and some, including Beowulf, have survived to the present day. Beowulf is the most famous work in Old English and has achieved national epic status in England, despite being set in Scandinavia.

Nearly all Anglo-Saxon authors are anonymous: 12 are known by name from medieval sources, but only four of those are known by their vernacular works with any certainty: Cædmon, Bede, Alfred the Great, and Cynewulf. Cædmon is the earliest English poet whose name is known. Cædmon's only known surviving work is Cædmon's Hymn, which probably dates from the late 7th century.

Chronicles contained a range of historical and literary accounts, and a notable example is the Anglo-Saxon Chronicle. The poem Battle of Maldon also deals with history. This is the name given to a work, of uncertain date, celebrating the real Battle of Maldon of 991, at which the Anglo-Saxons failed to prevent a Viking invasion.

Classical antiquity was not forgotten in Anglo-Saxon England, and several Old English poems are adaptations of late classical philosophical texts. The longest is King Alfred's (849–99) translation of Boethius' Consolation of Philosophy.

== Late medieval literature: 1066–1500 ==
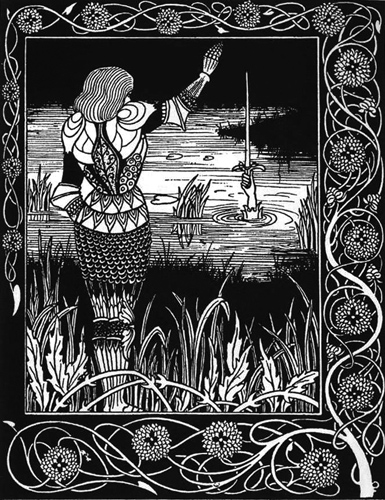
Sir Bedivere casts King Arthur's sword Excalibur back to the Lady of the Lake. The Arthurian Cycle has influenced British literature across languages and down the centuries.

The linguistic diversity of the islands in the medieval period contributed to a rich variety of artistic production, and made British literature distinctive and innovative.

Some works were still written in Latin; these include Gerald of Wales's late-12th-century book on his beloved Wales, Itinerarium Cambriae. After the Norman Conquest of 1066, Anglo-Norman literature developed, introducing literary trends from Continental Europe, such as the chanson de geste. However, the indigenous development of Anglo-Norman literature was precocious in comparison to continental Oïl literature.

Geoffrey of Monmouth (c. 1100 – c. 1155) was one of the major figures in the development of British history and of the popularity of the tales of King Arthur. He is best known for his chronicle Historia Regum Britanniae (History of the Kings of Britain) of 1136, which spread Celtic motifs to a wider audience. Wace (c. 1110 – after 1174), who wrote in Norman-French, is the earliest known poet from Jersey; he also developed the Arthurian legend.) At the end of the 12th century, Layamon in Brut adapted Wace to make the first English-language work to use the legends of King Arthur and the Knights of the Round Table. It was also the first historiography written in English since the Anglo-Saxon Chronicle.

=== Middle English ===
Interest in King Arthur continued in the 15th century with Sir Thomas Malory's Le Morte d'Arthur (1485), a popular and influential compilation of some French and English Arthurian romances. It was among the early books printed in England by Caxton.

In the later medieval period a new form of English now known as Middle English evolved. This is the earliest form which is comprehensible to modern readers and listeners, albeit not easily. Middle English Bible translations, notably Wycliffe's Bible, helped to establish English as a literary language. Wycliffe's Bible is the name now given to a group of Bible translations into Middle English that were made under the direction of, or at the instigation of, John Wycliffe. They appeared over a period from about 1382 to 1395.

Piers Plowman or Visio Willelmi de Petro Plowman (William's Vision of Piers Plowman) (written c. 1360–1387) is a Middle English allegorical narrative poem by William Langland. It is written in unrhymed alliterative verse divided into sections called "passūs" (Latin for "steps"). Piers is considered by many critics to be one of the early great works of English literature along with Chaucer's Canterbury Tales and Sir Gawain and the Green Knight during the Middle Ages.

Sir Gawain and the Green Knight is a late-14th-century Middle English alliterative romance. It is one of the better-known Arthurian stories, of an established type known as the "beheading game". Developing from Welsh, Irish and English tradition Sir Gawain highlights the importance of honour and chivalry. "Preserved in the same manuscript with Sir Gawayne were three other poems, now generally accepted as the work of its author, including the intricate elegiac poem, Pearl."

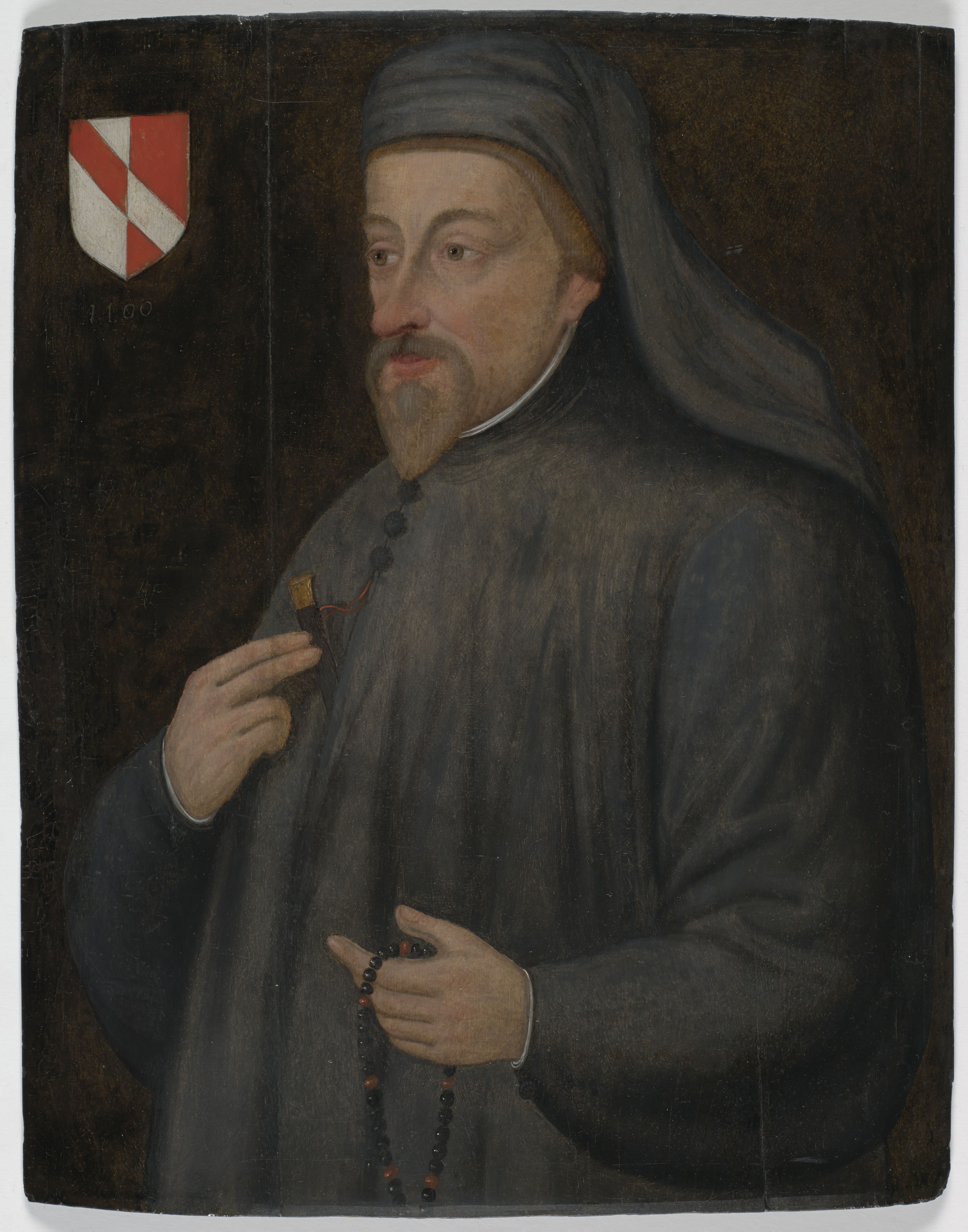
Geoffrey Chaucer is often referred to as the "Father of English literature"

Geoffrey Chaucer (c. 1343 – 1400), known as the Father of English literature, is widely considered the greatest English poet of the Middle Ages and was the first poet to have been buried in Poet's Corner in Westminster Abbey. Chaucer is best known today for The Canterbury Tales, a collection of stories written in Middle English (mostly written in verse although some are in prose), that are presented as part of a story-telling contest by a group of pilgrims as they travel together on a journey from Southwark to the shrine of Saint Thomas Becket at Canterbury Cathedral. Chaucer is a crucial figure in developing the legitimacy of Middle English at a time when the dominant literary languages in England were French and Latin.

The multilingual nature of the audience for literature in the 14th century can be illustrated by the example of John Gower (c. 1330 – October 1408). A contemporary of Langland and a personal friend of Chaucer, Gower is remembered primarily for three major works, the Mirroir de l'Omme, Vox Clamantis, and Confessio Amantis, three long poems written in Anglo-Norman, Latin, and Middle English respectively, which are united by common moral and political themes.

Women writers were also active, such as Marie de France in the 12th century and Julian of Norwich in the early 14th century. Julian's Revelations of Divine Love (around 1393) is believed to be the first published book written by a woman in the English language. Margery Kempe (c. 1373 – after 1438) is known for writing The Book of Margery Kempe, a work considered by some to be the first autobiography in the English language.

Major Scottish writers from the 15th century include Henrysoun, Dunbar, Douglas and Lyndsay. The works of Chaucer had an influence on Scottish writers.

=== Medieval drama ===
In the Middle Ages, drama in the vernacular languages of Europe may have emerged from religious enactments of the liturgy. Mystery plays were presented on the porches of the cathedrals or by strolling players on feast days. Miracle and mystery plays, along with moralities and interludes, later evolved into more elaborate forms of drama, such as was seen on the Elizabethan stages. Another form of medieval theatre was the mummers' plays, a form of early street theatre associated with the Morris dance, concentrating on themes such as Saint George and the Dragon and Robin Hood. These were folk tales re-telling old stories, and the actors travelled from town to town performing these for their audiences in return for money and hospitality.

Mystery plays and miracle plays are among the early formally developed plays in medieval Europe. Mystery plays focused on the representation of Bible stories in churches as tableaux with accompanying antiphonal song. They developed from the 10th to the 16th century, reaching the height of their popularity in the 15th century before being rendered obsolete by the rise of professional theatre.

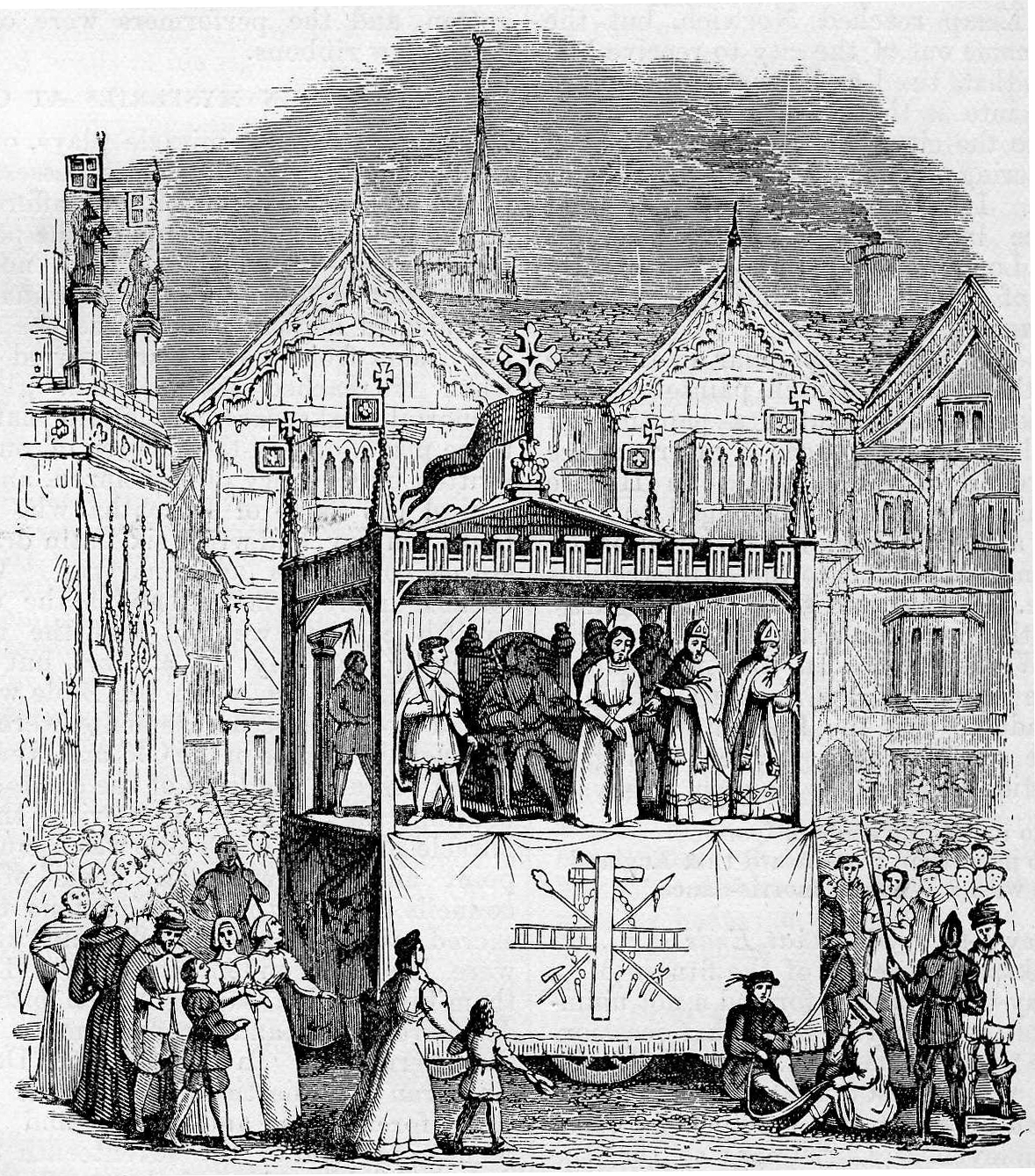
19th-century engraving of a performance from the Chester mystery play cycle

There are four complete or nearly complete extant English biblical collections of plays from the late medieval period. The most complete is the York cycle of forty-eight pageants. They were performed in the city of York, from the middle of the 14th century until 1569. Besides the Middle English drama, there are three surviving plays in Cornish known as the Ordinalia.

Having grown out of the religiously based mystery plays, the morality play is a genre of medieval and early Tudor theatrical entertainment, which represented a shift towards a more secular base for European theatre. Morality plays are a type of allegory in which the protagonist is met by personifications of various moral attributes who try to prompt him to choose a godly life over one of evil. The plays were most popular in Europe during the 15th and 16th centuries.

The Somonyng of Everyman (The Summoning of Everyman) (c. 1509 – 1519), usually referred to simply as Everyman, is a late 15th-century English morality play. Like John Bunyan's allegory Pilgrim's Progress (1678), Everyman examines the question of Christian salvation through the use of allegorical characters.

== The Renaissance: 1500 –1660 ==
Renaissance style and ideas were slow to penetrate England and Scotland, and the Elizabethan era (1558–1603) is usually regarded as the height of the English Renaissance. However, many scholars see its beginnings in the early 1500s during the reign of Henry VIII (1491 – 1547).

Italian literary influences arrived in Britain: the sonnet form was introduced into English by Thomas Wyatt in the early 16th century, and was developed by Henry Howard, Earl of Surrey, (1516/1517 – 1547), who also introduced blank verse into England, with his translation of Virgil's Aeneid in c. 1540.

The spread of printing affected the transmission of literature across Britain and Ireland. The first book printed in English, William Caxton's own translation of Recuyell of the Historyes of Troye, was printed abroad in 1473, to be followed by the establishment of the first printing press in England in 1474.

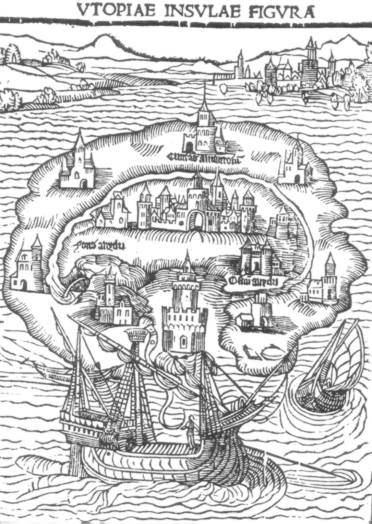
Thomas More book Utopia, illustration of imaginary island, 1516

Latin continued in use as a language of learning long after the Reformation had established the vernaculars as liturgical languages for the elites.

Utopia is a work of fiction and political philosophy by Thomas More (1478–1535) published in 1516. The book, written in Latin, is a frame narrative primarily depicting a fictional island society and its religious, social and political customs.

=== Elizabethan era: 1558–1603 ===
William Shakespeare's career straddled the change of Tudor and Stuart dynasties and encompassed English history and the emerging imperial idea of the 17th century.

==== Poetry ====
In the later 16th century, English poetry used elaborate language and extensive allusions to classical myths. Sir Edmund Spenser (c. 1552 – 1599) was the author of The Faerie Queene, an epic poem and fantastical allegory celebrating the Tudor dynasty and Elizabeth I. The works of Sir Philip Sidney (1554–1586), a poet, courtier and soldier, include Astrophel and Stella, The Defence of Poesy, and Arcadia. Poems intended to be set to music as songs, such as those by Thomas Campion, became popular as printed literature was disseminated more widely in households (see English Madrigal School).

==== Drama ====
During the reign of Elizabeth I (1558–1603) and then James I (1603–25), a London-centred culture that was both courtly and popular, produced great poetry and drama. The English playwrights were intrigued by Italian model: a conspicuous community of Italian actors had settled in London. The linguist and lexicographer John Florio (1553–1625), whose father was Italian, was a royal language tutor at the Court of James I, and a possible friend and influence on William Shakespeare, had brought much of the Italian language and culture to England. He was also the translator of Montaigne into English. The earlier Elizabethan plays include Gorboduc (1561), by Sackville and Norton, and Thomas Kyd's (1558–94) revenge tragedy The Spanish Tragedy (1592). Highly popular and influential in its time, The Spanish Tragedy established a new genre in English literature theatre, the revenge play or revenge tragedy. Jane Lumley (1537–1578) was the first person to translate Euripides into English. Her translation of Iphigeneia at Aulis is the first known dramatic work by a woman in English.

William Shakespeare (1564–1616) stands out in this period as a poet and playwright as yet unsurpassed. Shakespeare wrote plays in a variety of genres, including histories, tragedies, comedies and the late romances, or tragicomedies. Works written in the Elizabethan era include the comedy Twelfth Night, tragedy Hamlet, and history Henry IV, Part 1.

=== Jacobean period: 1603-1625 ===
==== Drama ====
Shakespeare's career continued during the reign of King James I, and in the early 17th century, he wrote the so-called "problem plays", like Measure for Measure as well as a number of his better-known tragedies, including King Lear and Anthony and Cleopatra. The plots of Shakespeare's tragedies often hinge on fatal errors or flaws, which overturn order and destroy the hero and those he loves. In his final period, Shakespeare turned to romance or tragicomedy and completed four major plays, including The Tempest. Less bleak than the tragedies, these four plays are graver in tone than the comedies of the 1590s, but they end with reconciliation and the forgiveness of potentially tragic errors.

Other important figures in Elizabethan and Jacobean theatre include Christopher Marlowe (1564–1593), Thomas Dekker (c. 1572 – 1632), John Fletcher (1579–1625) and Francis Beaumont (1584–1616). Marlowe's subject matter is different from Shakespeare's as it focuses more on the moral drama of the renaissance man. His play Doctor Faustus (c. 1592), is about a scientist and magician who sells his soul to the Devil. Beaumont and Fletcher are less known, but they may have helped Shakespeare write some of his better dramas, and were popular at the time. Beaumont's comedy, The Knight of the Burning Pestle (1607), satirises the rising middle class and especially the nouveaux riches.

After Shakespeare's death, the poet and dramatist Ben Jonson (1572–1637) was the leading literary figure of the Jacobean era. Jonson's aesthetics hark back to the Middle Ages and his characters embody the theory of humours, based on contemporary medical theory, though the stock types of Latin literature were an equal influence. Jonson's major plays include Volpone (1605 or 1606) and Bartholomew Fair (1614).

A popular style of theatre in Jacobean times was the revenge play, which had been popularised earlier by Thomas Kyd (1558–94), and then developed by John Webster (1578–1632) in the 17th century. Webster's famous plays are The White Devil (1612) and The Duchess of Malfi (1613). Other revenge tragedies include The Changeling written by Thomas Middleton and William Rowley.

==== Poetry ====
Shakespeare also popularised the English sonnet, which made significant changes to Petrarch's model. A collection of 154 sonnets, dealing with themes such as the passage of time, love, beauty and mortality, were first published in a 1609 quarto.

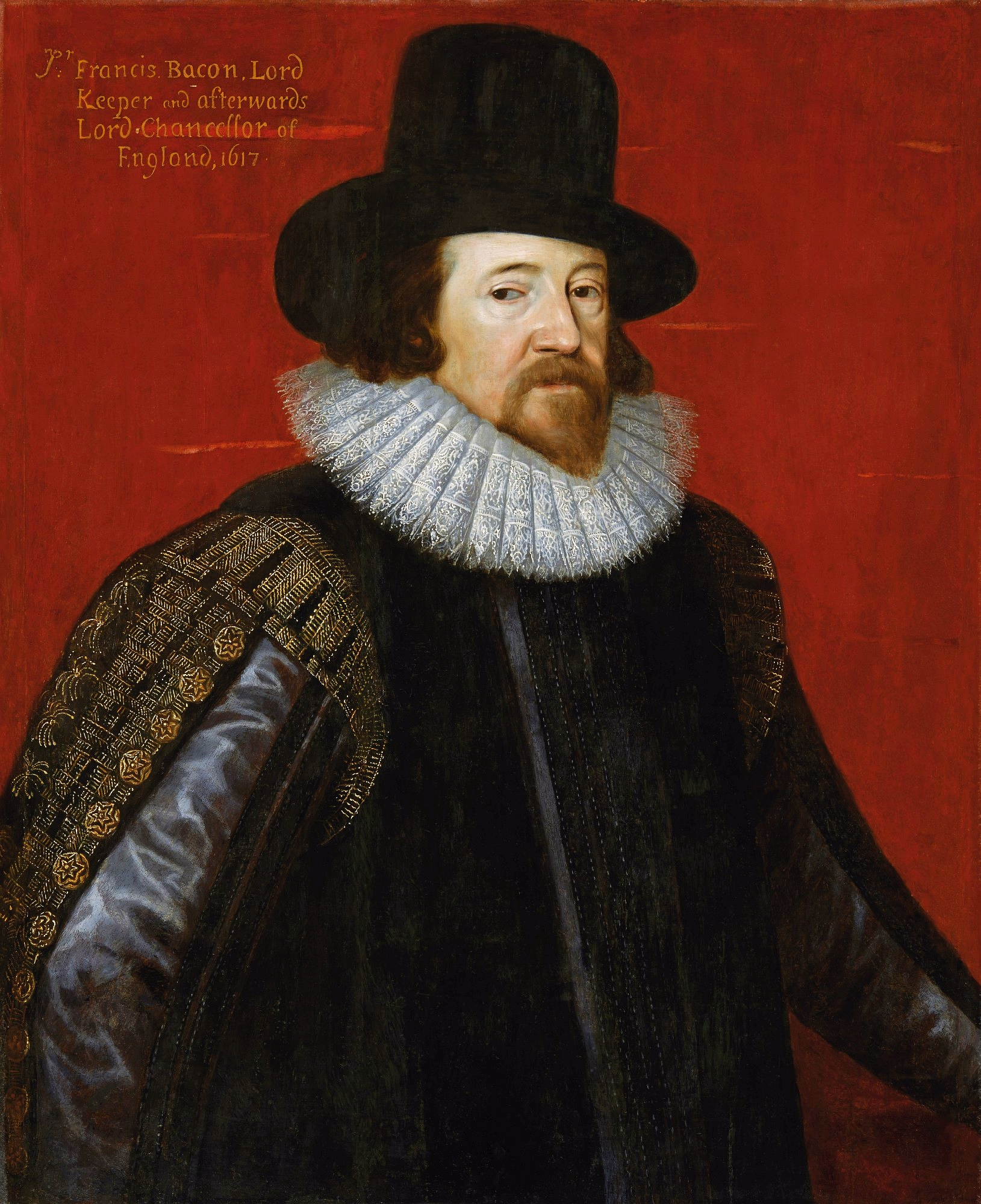
Francis Bacon

Besides Shakespeare, the major poets of the early 17th century included the metaphysical poets John Donne (1572–1631) and George Herbert (1593–1633). Influenced by continental Baroque, and taking as his subject matter both Christian mysticism and eroticism, Donne's metaphysical poetry uses unconventional or "unpoetic" figures, such as a compass or a mosquito, to achieve surprise effects.

George Chapman (?1559-?1634) was a successful playwright who is remembered chiefly for his translation in 1616 of Homer's Iliad and Odyssey into English verse. This was the first complete translation of either poem into the English language, and it had a profound influence on English literature.

==== Prose ====
Philosopher Sir Francis Bacon (1561–1626) wrote the utopian novel New Atlantis, and coined the phrase "Knowledge Is Power". Francis Godwin's 1638 The Man in the Moone recounts an imaginary voyage to the moon and is now regarded as the first work of science fiction in English literature.

At the Reformation, the translation of liturgy and the Bible into vernacular languages provided new literary models. The Book of Common Prayer (1549) and the Authorised King James Version of the Bible have been hugely influential. The King James Bible, one of the great translation projects in the history of English up to that time, was started in 1604 and completed in 1611. It continued the tradition of Bible translation into English from the original languages that began with the work of William Tyndale. (Previous translations into English had relied on the Vulgate). It became the standard Bible of the Church of England, and some consider it one of the great literary works of all time.

=== Late Renaissance: 1625–1660 ===
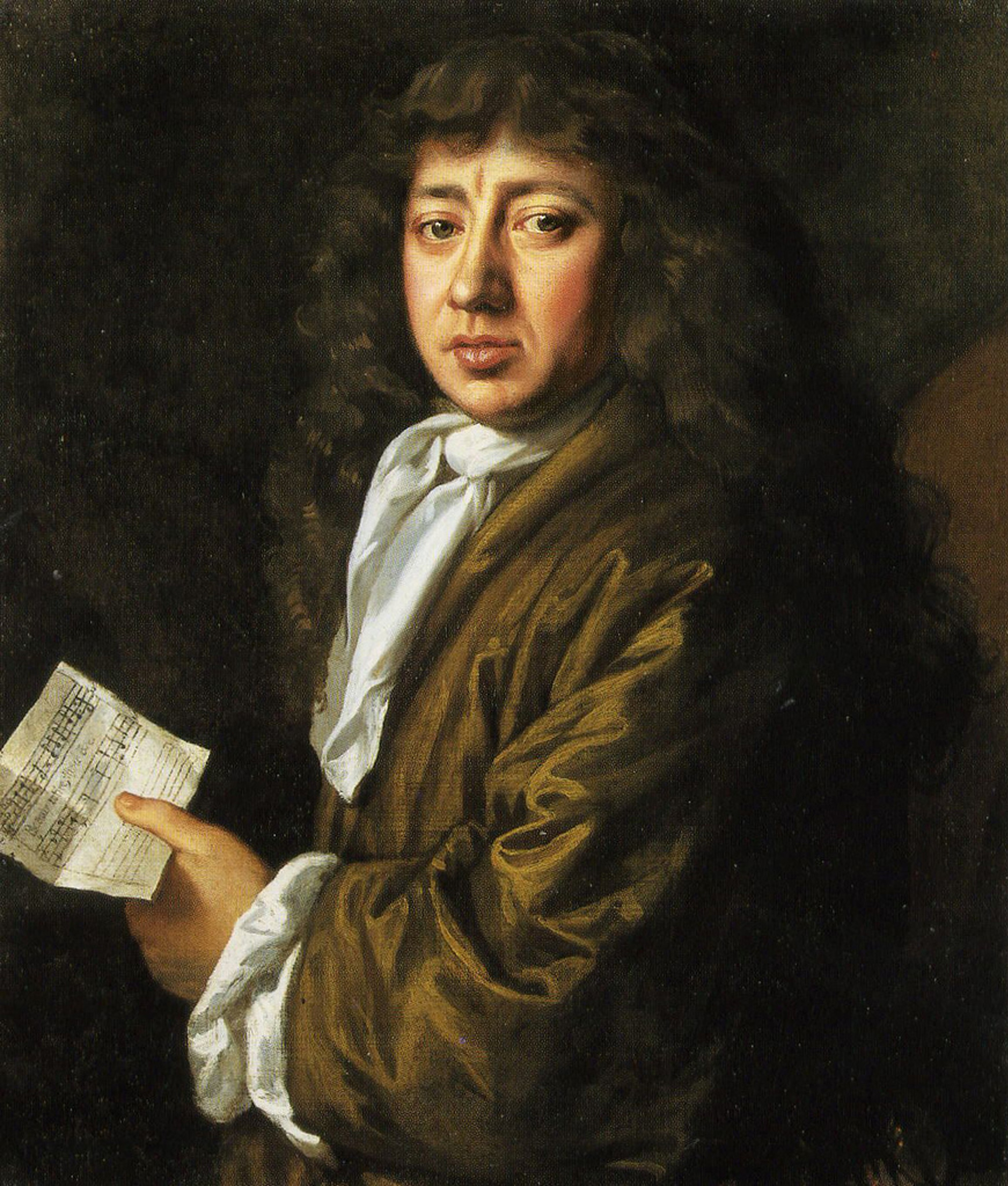
Samuel Pepys, took the diary beyond mere business transaction notes, into the realm of the personal.

The metaphysical poets continued writing in this period. Both John Donne and George Herbert died after 1625, but there was a second generation of metaphysical poets: Andrew Marvell (1621–1678), Thomas Traherne (1636 or 1637–1674) and Henry Vaughan (1622–1695). Their style was witty, with metaphysical conceits – far-fetched or unusual similes or metaphors, such as Marvell's comparison of the soul with a drop of dew; or Donne's description of the effects of absence on lovers to the action of a pair of compasses.

Another important group of poets at this time were the Cavalier poets. They were an important group of writers, who came from the classes that supported King Charles I during the Wars of the Three Kingdoms (1639–51). (King Charles reigned from 1625 and was executed in 1649). The best known of these poets are Robert Herrick, Richard Lovelace, Thomas Carew, and Sir John Suckling. They "were not a formal group, but all were influenced" by Ben Jonson. Most of the Cavalier poets were courtiers, with notable exceptions. For example, Robert Herrick was not a courtier, but his style marks him as a Cavalier poet. Cavalier works make use of allegory and classical allusions, and they are influenced by Latin authors Horace, Cicero, and Ovid.

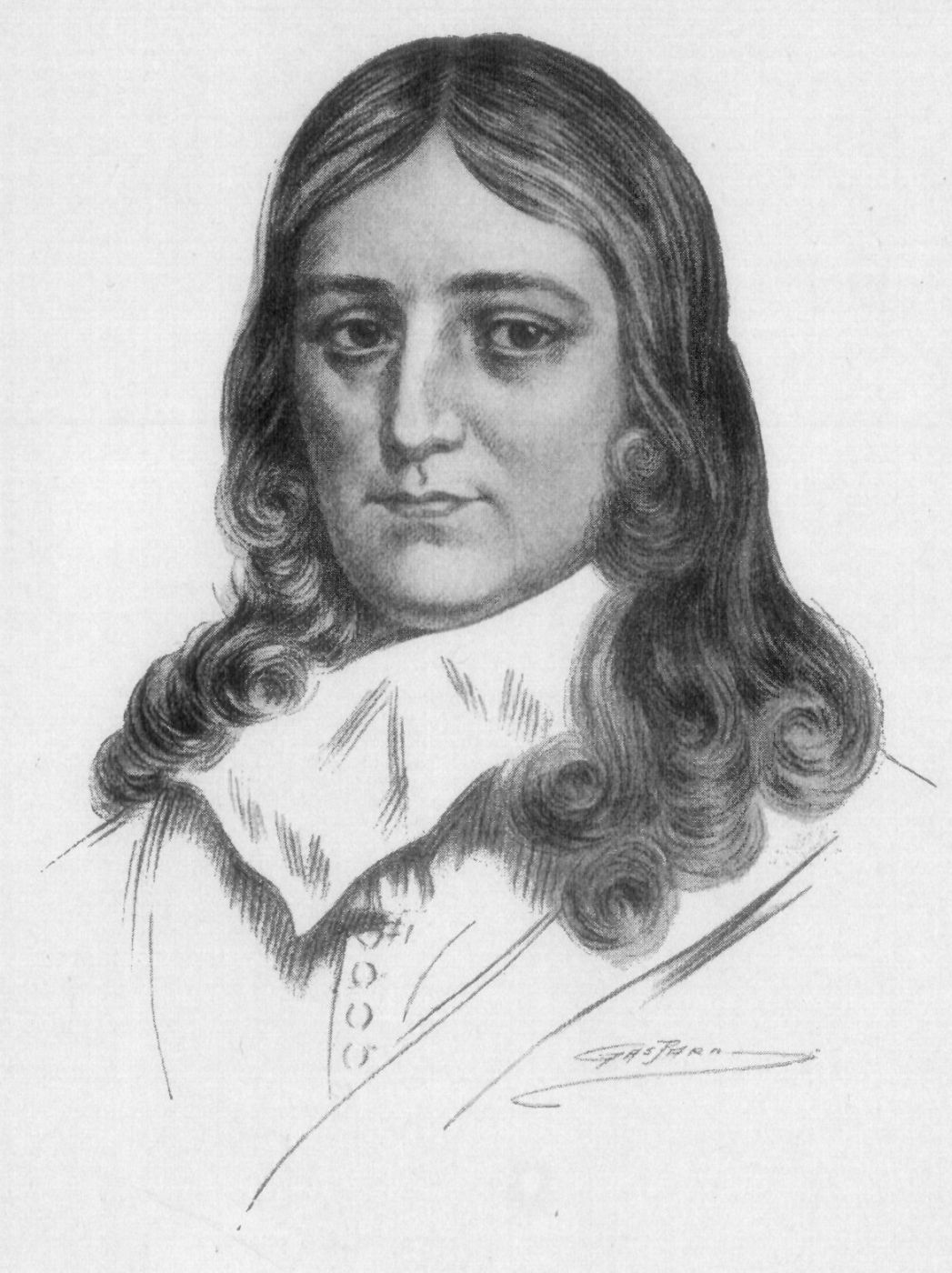
John Milton. His religious epic poem Paradise Lost was published in 1667.

John Milton (1608–74) is one of the great English poets, who wrote at a time of religious flux and political upheaval. He is generally seen as the last major poet of the English Renaissance, though his major epic poems were written in the Restoration period, including Paradise Lost (1671). Among these are L'Allegro, 1631; Il Penseroso, 1634; Comus (a masque), 1638; and Lycidas, (1638). His later major works are Paradise Regained, 1671 and Samson Agonistes, 1671. Milton's works reflect deep personal convictions, a passion for freedom and self-determination, and the urgent issues and political turbulence of his day. Writing in English, Latin, and Italian, he achieved international renown within his lifetime, and his celebrated Areopagitica (1644), written in condemnation of pre-publication censorship, is among history's influential and impassioned defences of free speech and freedom of the press. William Hayley's 1796 biography called him the "greatest English author", and he remains generally regarded "as one of the preeminent writers in the English language".

Thomas Urquhart (1611–1660) translation of Rabelais' Gargantua and Pantagruel into English has been described as "the greatest Scottish translation since Gavin Douglas's Eneados".

== The Restoration: 1660–1700 ==
=== Drama ===
The Restoration of the monarchy in 1660 launched a fresh start for literature, both in celebration of the new worldly and playful court of the king, and in reaction to it. Theatres in England reopened after having been closed during the protectorship of Oliver Cromwell, Puritanism lost its momentum, and the bawdy "Restoration comedy" became a recognisable genre. Restoration comedy refers to English comedies written and performed in the Restoration period from 1660 to 1710. In addition, women were allowed to perform on stage for the first time.

The Restoration of the monarchy in Ireland enabled Ogilby to resume his position as Master of the Revels and open the first Theatre Royal in Dublin in 1662 in Smock Alley. In 1662, Katherine Philips went to Dublin, where she completed a translation of Pierre Corneille's Pompée, produced with great success in 1663 in the Smock Alley Theatre, and printed in the same year both in Dublin and London. Although other women had translated or written dramas, her translation of Pompey broke new ground as the first rhymed version of a French tragedy in English and the first English play written by a woman to be performed on the professional stage. Aphra Behn (one of the women writers dubbed "The fair triumvirate of wit") was a prolific dramatist and one of the early English professional female writers. Her greatest dramatic success was The Rover (1677).

=== Poetry ===
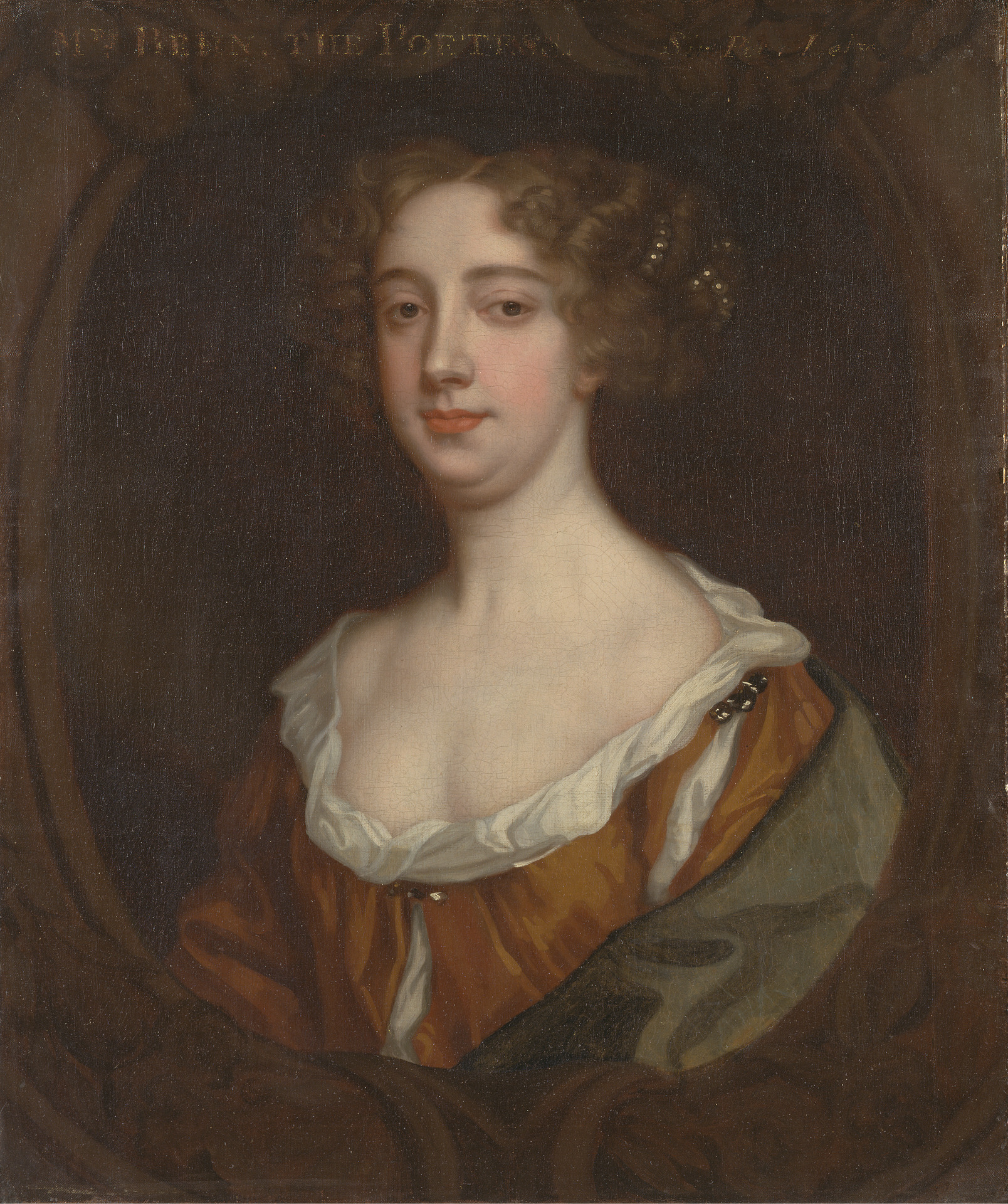
Aphra Behn

Behn's depiction of the character Willmore in The Rover and the witty, poetry-reciting rake Dorimant in George Etherege's The Man of Mode (1676) are seen as a satire on John Wilmot, 2nd Earl of Rochester (1647–1680), an English libertine poet, and a wit of the Restoration court. His contemporary Andrew Marvell described him as "the best English satirist", and he is generally considered to be the most considerable poet and the most learned among the Restoration wits. His A Satyr Against Reason and Mankind is assumed to be a Hobbesian critique of rationalism. Rochester's poetic work varies widely in form, genre, and content. He was part of a "mob of gentlemen who wrote with ease", who continued to produce their poetry in manuscripts, rather than in publication. As a consequence, some of Rochester's work deals with topical concerns, such as satires of courtly affairs in libels, to parodies of the styles of his contemporaries, such as Sir Charles Scroope. He is also notable for his impromptus, Voltaire, who spoke of Rochester as "the man of genius, the great poet", admired his satire for its "energy and fire" and translated some lines into French to "display the shining imagination his lordship only could boast".

John Dryden (1631–1700) was an English poet, literary critic, translator, and playwright who dominated the literary life of Restoration England to such a point that the period came to be known in literary circles as the Age of Dryden. He established the heroic couplet as a standard form of English poetry by writing successful satires, religious pieces, fables, epigrams, compliments, prologues, and plays with it; he also introduced the alexandrine and triplet into the form. In his poems, translations, and criticism, he established a poetic diction appropriate to the heroic couplet. Dryden's great achievements were in satiric verse in works like the mock-heroic MacFlecknoe (1682). W. H. Auden referred to him as "the master of the middle style" that was a model for his contemporaries and for much of the 18th century. The considerable loss felt by the English literary community at his death was evident from the elegies that it inspired. Alexander Pope (1688–1744) was heavily influenced by Dryden, and often borrowed from him; other writers in the 18th century were equally influenced by both Dryden and Pope.

Though Ben Jonson had been poet laureate to James I in England, this was not then a formal position and the formal title of Poet Laureate, as a royal office, was first conferred by letters patent on John Dryden in 1670. The post then became a regular British institution.

=== Prose ===
Diarists John Evelyn (1620–1706) and Samuel Pepys (1633–1703) depicted everyday London life and the cultural scene of the times. Their works are among the more important primary sources for the Restoration period in England, and consists of eyewitness accounts of many great events, such as the Great Plague of London (1644–5), and the Great Fire of London (1666).

The publication of The Pilgrim's Progress (Part I:1678; 1684), established the Puritan preacher John Bunyan (1628–88) as a notable writer. Bunyan's The Pilgrim's Progress is an allegory of personal salvation and a guide to the Christian life. Bunyan writes about how the individual can prevail against the temptations of mind and body that threaten damnation. The book is written in a straightforward narrative and shows influence from both drama and biography, and yet it also shows an awareness of the grand allegorical tradition found in Edmund Spenser.

== 18th century ==
=== The Augustan age: 1701–1750 ===
The late 17th, early 18th century (1689–1750) in English literature is known as the Augustan Age. Writers at this time "greatly admired their Roman counterparts, imitated their works and frequently drew parallels between" contemporary world and the age of the Roman emperor Augustus (27 AD – BC 14) (see Augustan literature (ancient Rome) ). Some of the major writers in this period were the Anglo-Irish writer Jonathan Swift (1667–1745), William Congreve, (1670–1729), Joseph Addison (1672–1719), Richard Steele (1672–1729), Alexander Pope (1688–1744), Samuel Richardson (1689–1761), Henry Fielding (1707–54), Samuel Johnson (1709–84).

==== 1707: Birth of Britain ====
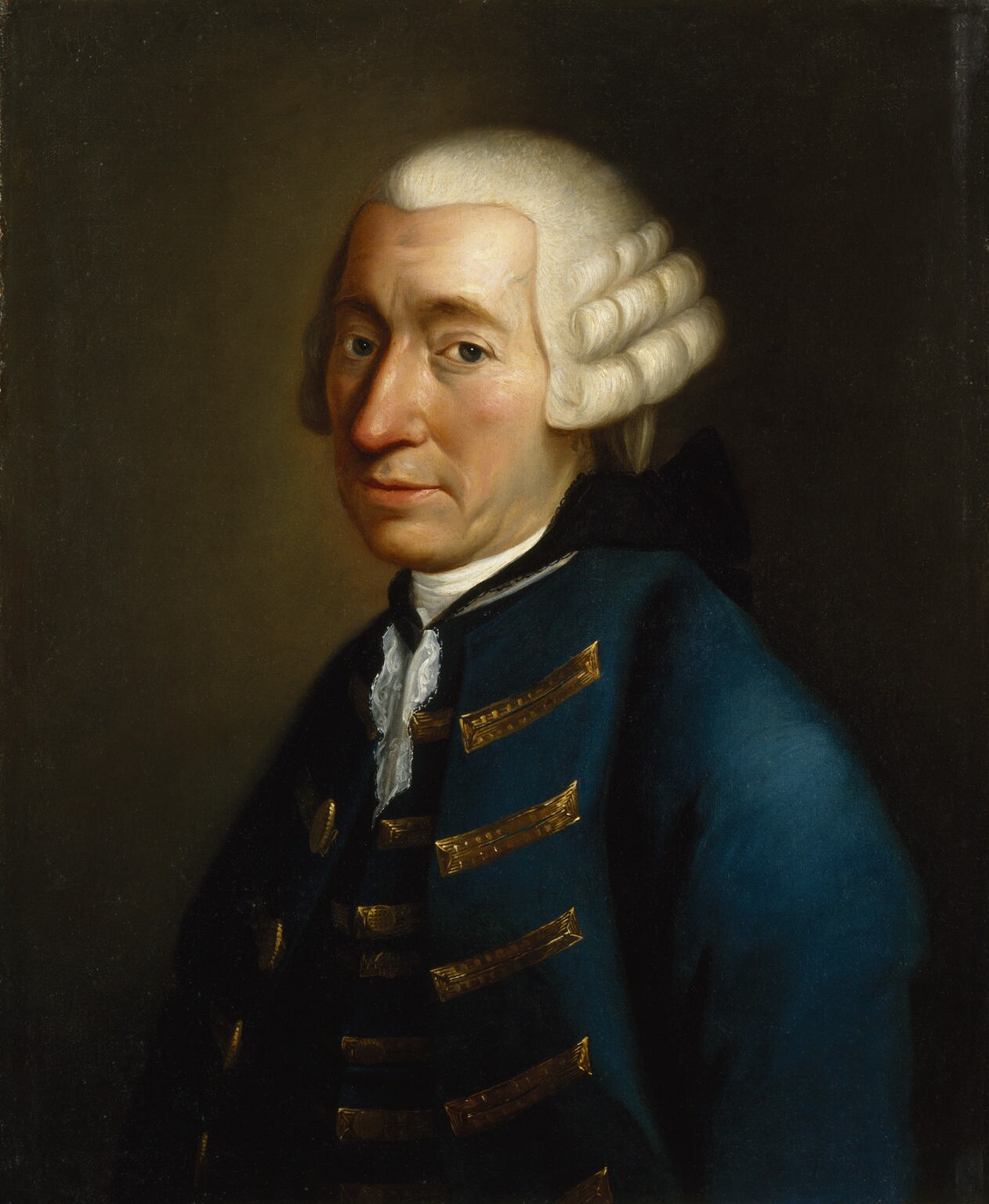
Portrait of Tobias Smollett

The Union of the Parliaments of Scotland and England in 1707 to form a single Kingdom of Great Britain and the creation of a joint state by the Acts of Union had little impact on the literature of England nor on national consciousness among English writers. The situation in Scotland was different: the desire to maintain a cultural identity while partaking of the advantages offered by the English literary market and English literary standard language led to what has been described as the "invention of British literature" by Scottish writers. English writers, if they considered Britain at all, tended to assume it was merely England writ large; Scottish writers were more clearly aware of the new state as a "cultural amalgam comprising more than just England". James Thomson's "Rule Britannia!" is an example of the Scottish championing of this new national and literary identity. With the invention of British literature came the development of the early British novels, in contrast to the English novel of the 18th century which continued to deal with England and English concerns rather than exploring the changed political, social and literary environment. Tobias Smollett (1721–71) was a Scottish pioneer of the British novel, exploring the prejudices inherent within the new social structure of the country through comic picaresque novels. His The Adventures of Roderick Random (1748) is the first major novel written in English to have a Scotsman as hero, and the multinational voices represented in the narrative confront Anti-Scottish sentiment, being published only two years after the Battle of Culloden. The Expedition of Humphry Clinker (1771) brings together characters from the extremes of Britain to question how cultural and linguistic differences can be accommodated within the new British identity, and influenced Charles Dickens. Richard Cumberland wrote patriotic comedies depicting characters taken from the "outskirts of the empire,". His most popular play "The West Indian" (1771) was performed in North America and the West Indies.

==== Prose, including the novel ====
In prose, the earlier part of the period was overshadowed by the development of the English essay. Joseph Addison and Richard Steele's The Spectator established the form of the British periodical essay, inventing the pose of the detached observer of human life who can meditate upon the world without advocating any specific changes in it. However, this was also the time when the English novel, first emerging in the Restoration, developed into a major art form. Daniel Defoe turned from journalism and writing criminal lives for the press to writing fictional criminal lives with Roxana and Moll Flanders.

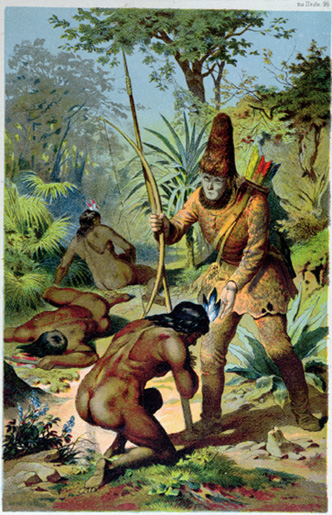
Daniel Defoe's 1719 castaway novel Robinson Crusoe, with Crusoe standing over Man Friday after freeing him from the cannibals

The English novel has generally been seen as beginning with Daniel Defoe's Robinson Crusoe (1719) and Moll Flanders (1722), though John Bunyan's The Pilgrim's Progress (1678) and Aphra Behn's, Oroonoko (1688) are also contenders. Other major 18th-century British novelists are Samuel Richardson (1689–1761), author of the epistolary novels Pamela, or Virtue Rewarded (1740) and Clarissa; or, The History of a Young Lady (1747–48); Henry Fielding (1707–54), who wrote Joseph Andrews (1742) and The History of Tom Jones, a Foundling (1749).

If Addison and Steele were dominant in one type of prose, then Jonathan Swift author of the satire Gulliver's Travels was in another. In A Modest Proposal and the Drapier Letters, Swift reluctantly defended the Irish people from the predations of colonialism. This position provoked riots and arrests, but Swift, who had no love of Irish Roman Catholics, was outraged by the abuses he saw.

The English pictorial satirist and editorial cartoonist William Hogarth (1697–1764) has been credited with pioneering Western sequential art. His work ranged from realistic portraiture to comic strip-like series of pictures called "modern moral subjects". Much of his work satirises contemporary politics and customs.

==== Drama ====
Although documented history of Irish theatre began at least as early as 1601, the early Irish dramatists of note were William Congreve (1670–1729), one of the more interesting writers of Restoration comedies and author of The Way of the World (1700) and playwright, George Farquhar (?1677–1707), The Recruiting Officer (1706). (Restoration comedy refers to English comedies written and performed in the Restoration period from 1660 to 1710. Comedy of manners is used as a synonym of Restoration comedy).

Anglo-Irish drama in the 18th century also includes Charles Macklin (?1699–1797), and Arthur Murphy (1727–1805).

The age of Augustan drama was brought to an end by the censorship established by the Licensing Act 1737. After 1737, authors with strong political or philosophical points to make would no longer turn to the stage as their first hope of making a living, and novels began to have dramatic structures involving only normal human beings, as the stage was closed off for serious authors. Prior to the Licensing Act 1737, theatre was the first choice for most wits. After it, the novel was

==== Poetry ====
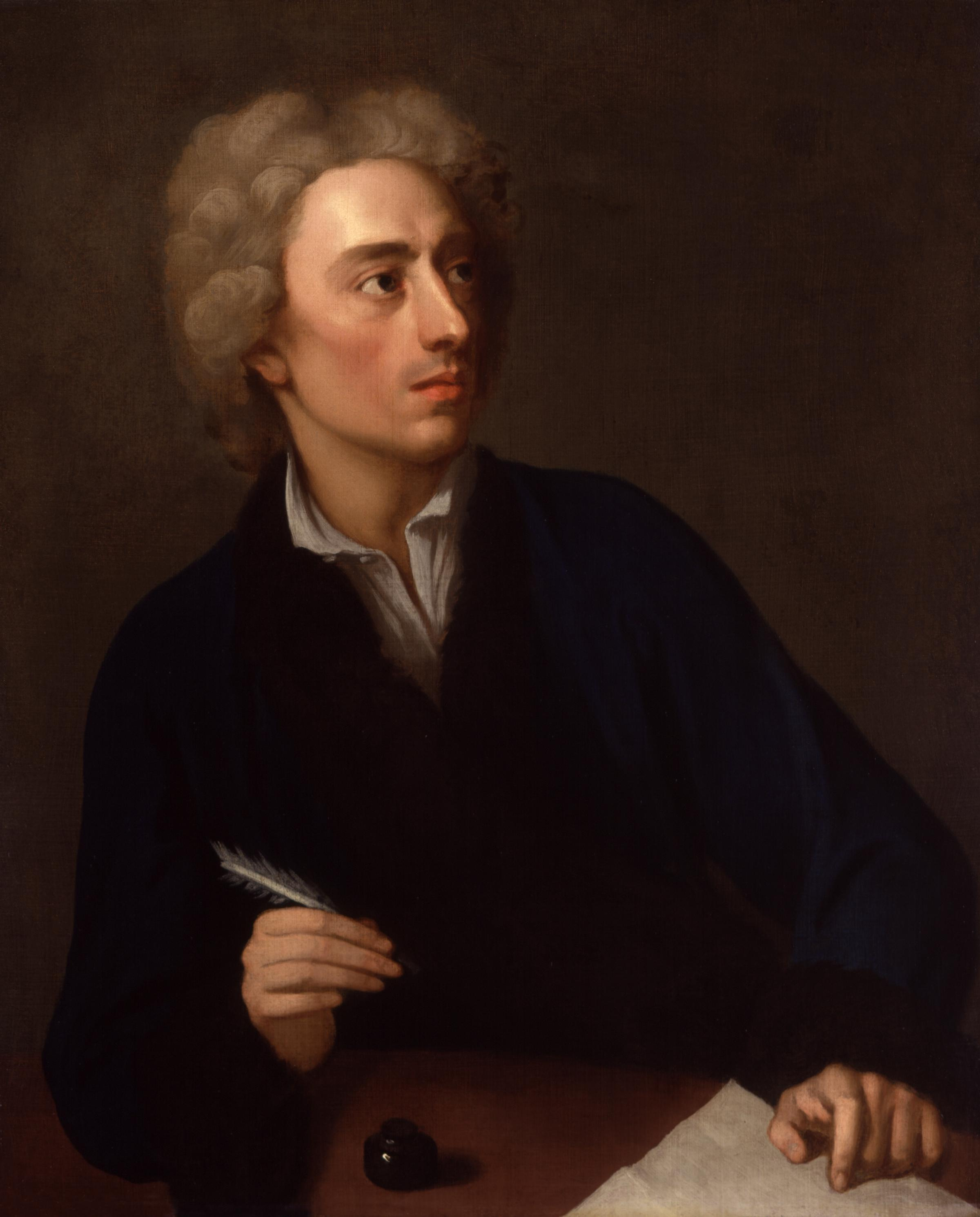
Pope

The most outstanding poet of the age is Alexander Pope (1688–1744), whose major works include: The Rape of the Lock (1712; enlarged in 1714); a translation of the Iliad (1715–20); a translation of the Odyssey (1725–26); The Dunciad (1728; 1743). Since his death, Pope has been in a constant state of re-evaluation. His high artifice, strict prosody, and, at times, the sheer cruelty of his satire were an object of derision for the Romantic poets, and it was not until the 1930s that his reputation was revived. Pope is now considered the dominant poetic voice of his century, a model of prosodic elegance, biting wit, and an enduring, demanding moral force. The Rape of the Lock and The Dunciad are masterpieces of the mock-epic genre.

It was during this time that poet James Thomson (1700–48) produced his melancholy The Seasons (1728–30) and Edward Young (1683–1765) wrote his poem Night-Thoughts (1742).

=== The roots of Romanticism: 1750–1798 ===
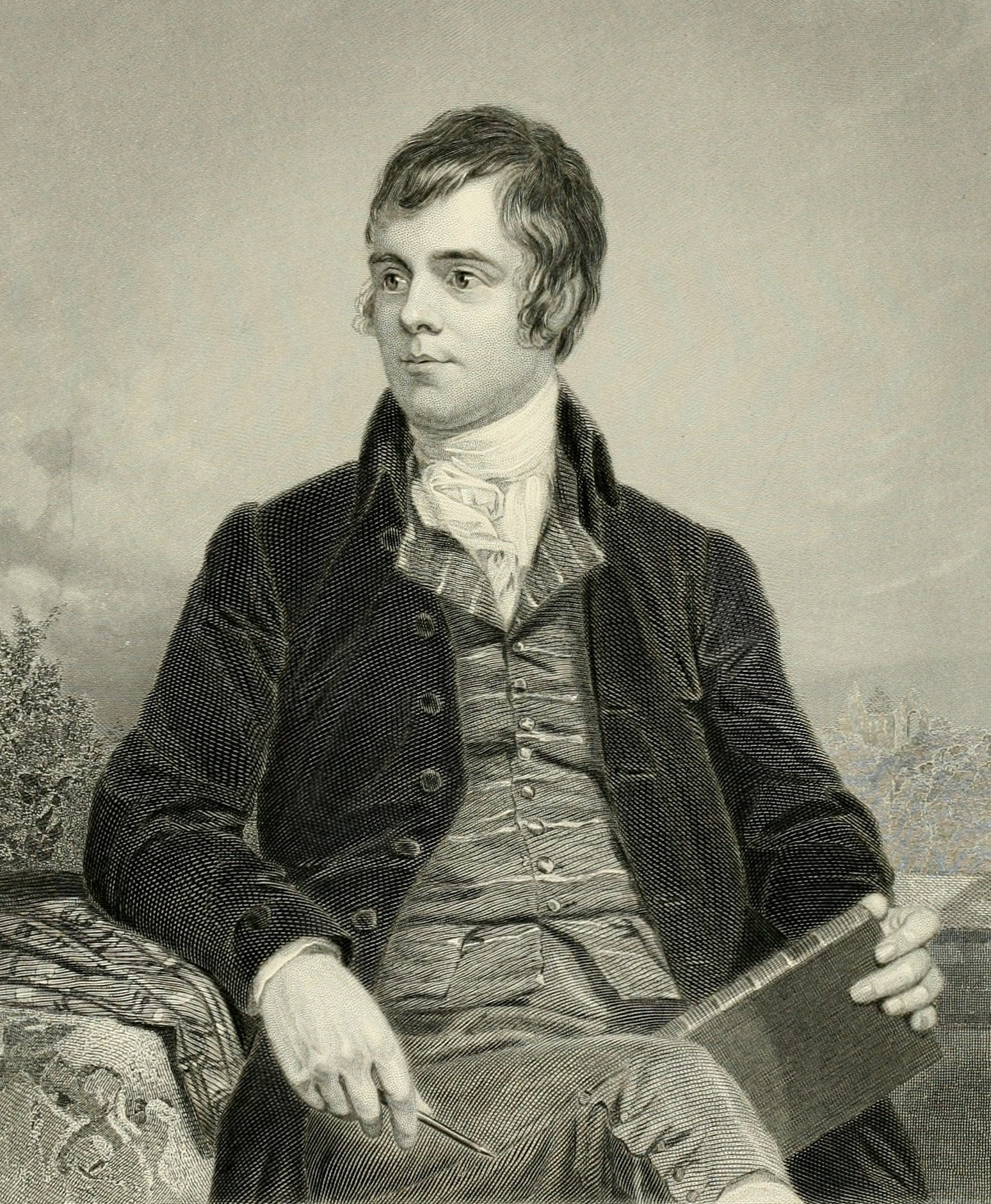
Robert Burns inspired many vernacular writers across Britain and Ireland.

The second half of the 18th century is sometimes called the "Age of Johnson". Samuel Johnson (1709–1784), often referred to as Dr Johnson, was an English author who made lasting contributions to English literature as a poet, essayist, moralist, literary critic, biographer, editor and lexicographer. Johnson has been described as "arguably the most distinguished man of letters in English history". After nine years of work, Johnson's A Dictionary of the English Language was published in 1755; it had a far-reaching effect on Modern English and has been described as "one of the greatest single achievements of scholarship.". Through works such as the "Dictionary, his edition of Shakespeare, and his Lives of the Poets in particular, he helped invent what we now call English Literature".

This period of the 18th century saw the emergence of three major Irish authors Oliver Goldsmith (1728–1774), Richard Brinsley Sheridan (1751–1816), and Laurence Sterne (1713–1768). Goldsmith settled in London in 1756, where he published the novel The Vicar of Wakefield (1766), a pastoral poem with the title The Deserted Village (1770) and two plays: The Good-Natur'd Man and She Stoops to Conquer. Sheridan was born in Dublin, but his family moved to England in the 1750s. His first play The Rivals was performed at Covent Garden, and it was an instant success. He became the most significant London playwright of the late 18th century with plays like The School for Scandal and The Critic. Sterne published his famous novel Tristram Shandy in parts from 1759 to 1767.

The sentimental novel or the novel of sensibility is a genre which developed during the second half of the 18th century. Among the famous sentimental novels in English are Samuel Richardson's Pamela, or Virtue Rewarded (1740), Oliver Goldsmith's The Vicar of Wakefield (1766), and Laurence Sterne's Tristram Shandy (1759–1767).

Another novel genre also developed in this period. In 1778, Frances Burney (1752–1840) wrote Evelina, one of the early novels of manners. Fanny Burney's novels indeed "were enjoyed and admired by Jane Austen".

The graveyard poets were a number of pre-Romantic English poets, writing in the 1740s and later, whose works are characterised by their gloomy meditations on mortality, "skulls and coffins, epitaphs and worms" in the context of the graveyard. To this was added, by later practitioners, a feeling for the 'sublime' and uncanny, and an interest in ancient English poetic forms and folk poetry. They are often considered precursors of the Gothic genre. The poets include; Thomas Gray (1716–71), Elegy Written in a Country Churchyard (1751); William Cowper (1731–1800); Christopher Smart (1722–71); Thomas Chatterton (1752–70); Robert Blair (1699–1746); and Edward Young (1683–1765), The Complaint, or Night Thoughts on Life, Death and Immortality (1742–45).

Other precursors of Romanticism are the poets James Thomson (1700–48) and James Macpherson (1736–96), the Gothic novel and the novel of sensibility.

Also foreshadowing Romanticism was Gothic fiction, in works such as Horace Walpole's 1764 novel The Castle of Otranto. The Gothic fiction genre combines elements of horror and romance. A pioneering Gothic novelist was Ann Radcliffe author of The Mysteries of Udolpho (1794). The Monk (1796), by Matthew Lewis, is another notable early work in both the Gothic and horror genres.

James Macpherson (1736–96) was the first Scottish poet to gain an international reputation. Claiming to have found poetry written by the ancient bard Ossian, he published translations that acquired international popularity, being proclaimed as a Celtic equivalent of the Classical epics. Both Robert Burns (1759–96) and Walter Scott (1771–1832) were highly influenced by the Ossian cycle.

Robert Burns (1759–1796) was a pioneer of the Romantic movement, and after his death, he became a cultural icon in Scotland. Among poems and songs of Burns that remain well known across the world are "Auld Lang Syne"; "A Red, Red Rose"; "A Man's A Man for A' That"; "To a Mouse"; "Tam o' Shanter" and "Ae Fond Kiss".

== Romanticism: 1798–1837 ==
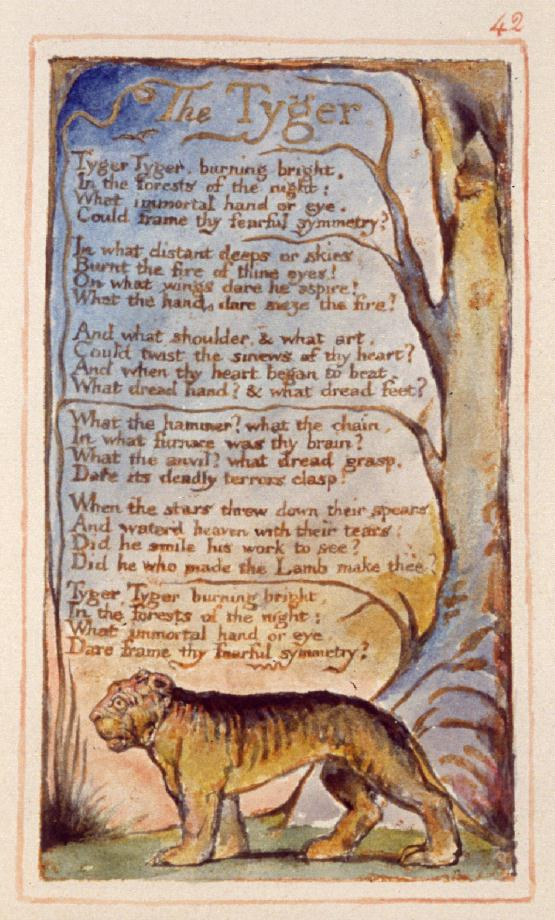
William Blake's "The Tyger", published in his Songs of Innocence and of Experience, is a work of Romanticism.

Romanticism was an artistic, literary, and intellectual movement that originated in Europe toward the end of the 18th century. Various dates are given for the Romantic period in British literature, but here the publishing of Lyrical Ballads in 1798 is taken as the beginning, and the crowning of Queen Victoria in 1837 as its end, even though, for example, William Wordsworth lived until 1850 and William Blake published before 1798. The writers of this period, however, "did not think of themselves as 'Romantics'", and the term was first used by critics of the Victorian period.

The Romantic period was one of major social change in England, because of the depopulation of the countryside and the rapid development of overcrowded industrial cities, that took place in the period roughly from 1785 to 1830. The movement of so many people in England was the result of two forces: the Agricultural Revolution, that involved the enclosure of the land, drove workers off the land, and the Industrial Revolution which provided them employment, "in the factories and mills, operated by machines driven by steam-power". Indeed, Romanticism may be seen in part as a reaction to the Industrial Revolution, though it was also a revolt against aristocratic social and political norms of the Age of Enlightenment, as well a reaction against the scientific rationalisation of nature. The French Revolution was an especially important influence on the political thinking of many of the Romantic poets.

The landscape is often prominent in the poetry of this period, so that the Romantics, especially perhaps Wordsworth, are often described as 'nature poets'. However, the longer Romantic 'nature poems' have a wider concern because they are usually meditations on "an emotional problem or personal crisis".

=== Romantic poetry ===
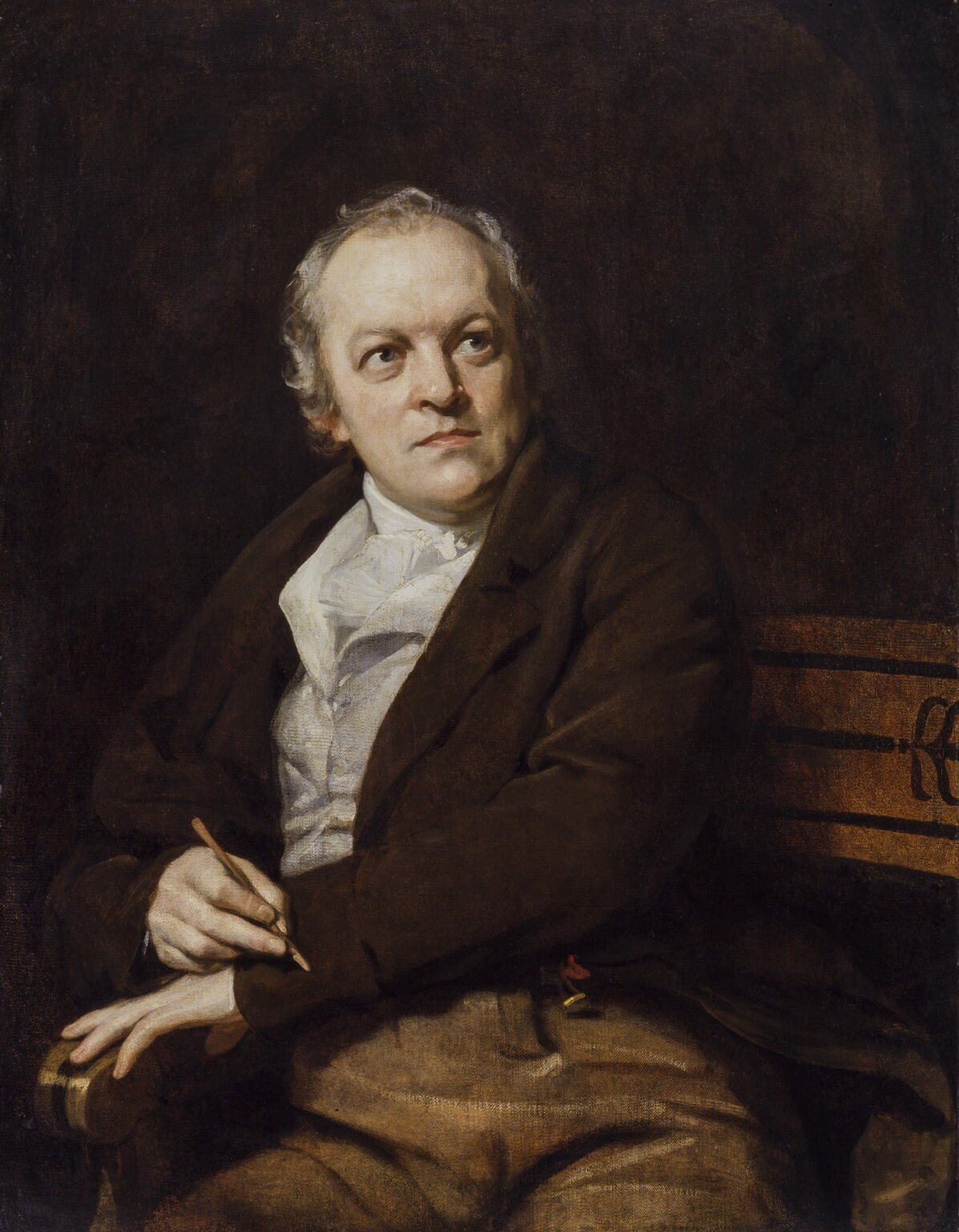
William Blake is considered a seminal figure in the history of both the poetry and visual arts of the Romantic Age.

The poet, painter, and printmaker William Blake (1757–1827) was one of the early of the English Romantic poets. Largely disconnected from the major streams of the literature of the time, Blake was generally unrecognised during his lifetime, but is now considered a seminal figure in the history of both the poetry and visual arts of the Romantic Age. Among his important works are Songs of Innocence (1789) and Songs of Experience (1794) "and profound and difficult 'prophecies'" such as Visions of the Daughters of Albion (1793), The First Book of Urizen (1794), and "Jerusalem: the Emanation of the Giant Albion" (1804–?20).

After Blake, among the early Romantics were the Lake Poets, a small group of friends, including William Wordsworth (1770–1850), Samuel Taylor Coleridge (1772–1834), Robert Southey (1774–1843) and journalist Thomas De Quincey (1785–1859). However, at the time, Walter Scott (1771–1832) was the most famous poet. Scott achieved immediate success with his long narrative poem The Lay of the Last Minstrel in 1805, followed by the full epic poem Marmion in 1808. Both were set in the distant Scottish past.

The early Romantic Poets brought a new emotionalism and introspection, and their emergence is marked by the first romantic manifesto in English literature, the "Preface" to Lyrical Ballads (1798). The poems in Lyrical Ballads were mostly by Wordsworth, but Coleridge contributed the long "Rime of the Ancient Mariner". Among Wordsworth's important poems, are "Michael", "Lines Composed a Few Miles Above Tintern Abbey", "Resolution and Independence", "Ode: Intimations of Immortality from Recollections of Early Childhood" and the autobiographical epic The Prelude.

Robert Southey (1774–1843) was another of the so-called "Lake Poets", and Poet Laureate for 30 years from 1813 to his death in 1843. Although his fame has been eclipsed by that of his contemporaries and friends William Wordsworth and Samuel Taylor Coleridge. Thomas De Quincey (1785–1859) was an English essayist, best known for his Confessions of an English Opium-Eater (1821), an autobiographical account of his laudanum and its effect on his life.

==== Second generation ====
Mary Shelley

The second generation of Romantic poets includes Lord Byron (1788–1824), Percy Bysshe Shelley (1792–1822) and John Keats (1795–1821). Byron, however, was still influenced by 18th-century satirists and was, perhaps, the least "romantic" of the three, preferring "the brilliant wit of Pope to what he called the 'wrong poetical system' of his Romantic contemporaries".

Though John Keats shared Byron and Shelley's radical politics, "his best poetry is not political". but is especially noted for its sensuous music and imagery, along with a concern with material beauty and the transience of life. Among his famous works are: "The Eve of St Agnes", "La Belle Dame sans Merci", "Ode to a Nightingale", "To Autumn".

Percy Shelley, known to contemporaries for his radical politics and association with figures such as Byron and Mary Wollstonecraft Shelley, daughter of radical thinkers William Godwin and Mary Wollstonecraft, was the third major romantic poet of the second generation. Generally regarded as among the great lyric poets in the English language, Shelley is perhaps best known for poems such as Ozymandias, Ode to the West Wind, To a Skylark and Adonaïs, an elegy written on the death of Keats. Mary Shelley (1797–1851) is remembered as the author of Frankenstein (1818), an important Gothic novel, as well as being an early example of science fiction.

Although sticking to its forms, Felicia Hemans began a process of undermining the Romantic tradition, a deconstruction that was continued by Letitia Elizabeth Landon, as "an urban poet deeply attentive to themes of decay and decomposition". Landon's novel forms of metrical romance and dramatic monologue were much copied and contributed to her long-lasting influence on Victorian poetry.

==== Other poets ====
Another important poet in this period was John Clare (1793–1864). Clare was the son of a farm labourer, who came to be known for his celebratory representations of the English countryside and his lamentation for the changes taking place in rural England.

George Crabbe (1754–1832) was an English poet who, during the Romantic period, wrote "closely observed, realistic portraits of rural life...in the heroic couplets of the Augustan age". Crabbe's works include The Village (1783), Poems (1807), The Borough (1810).

=== Romanticism and the novel ===
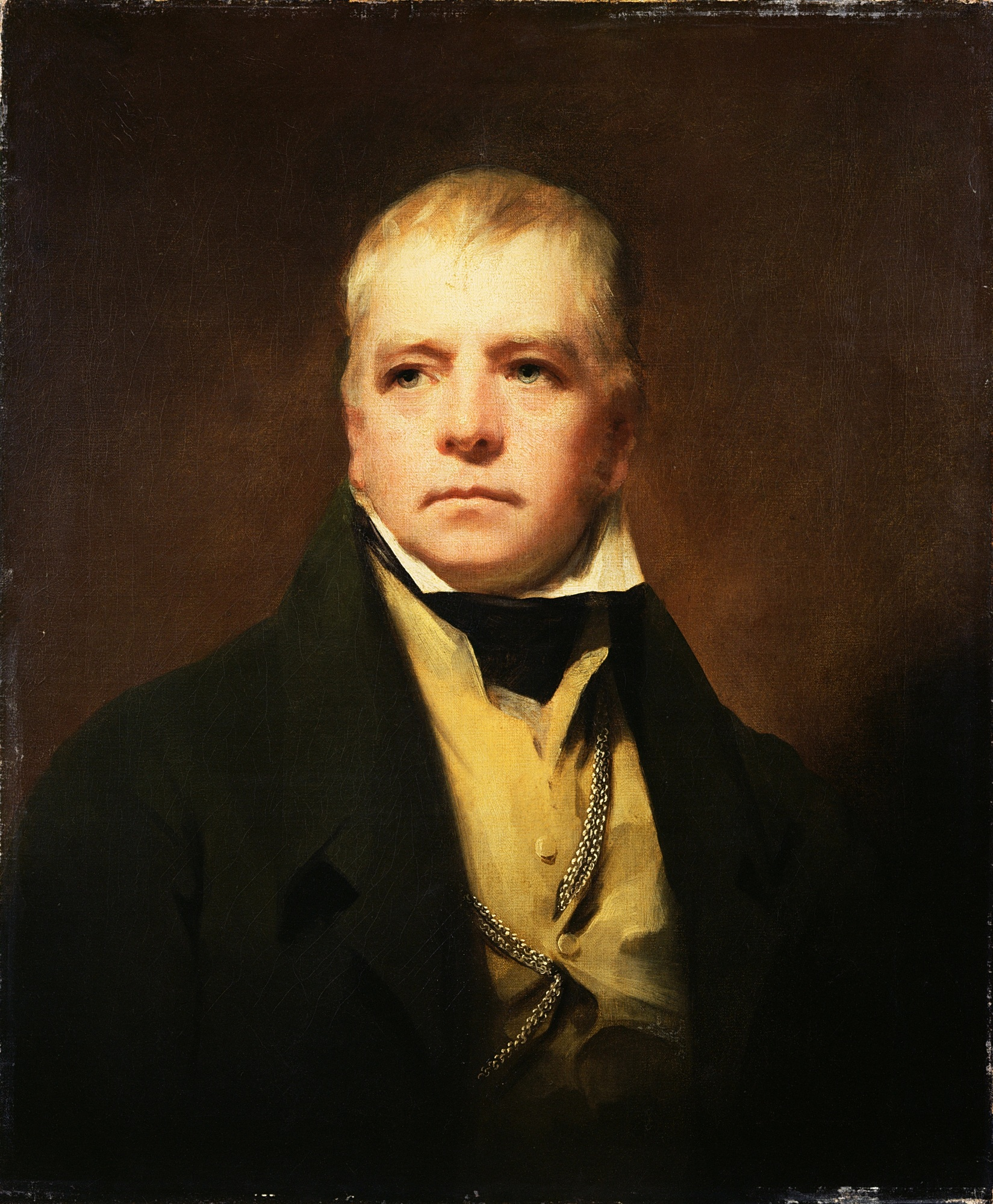
Sir Walter Scott, 1822

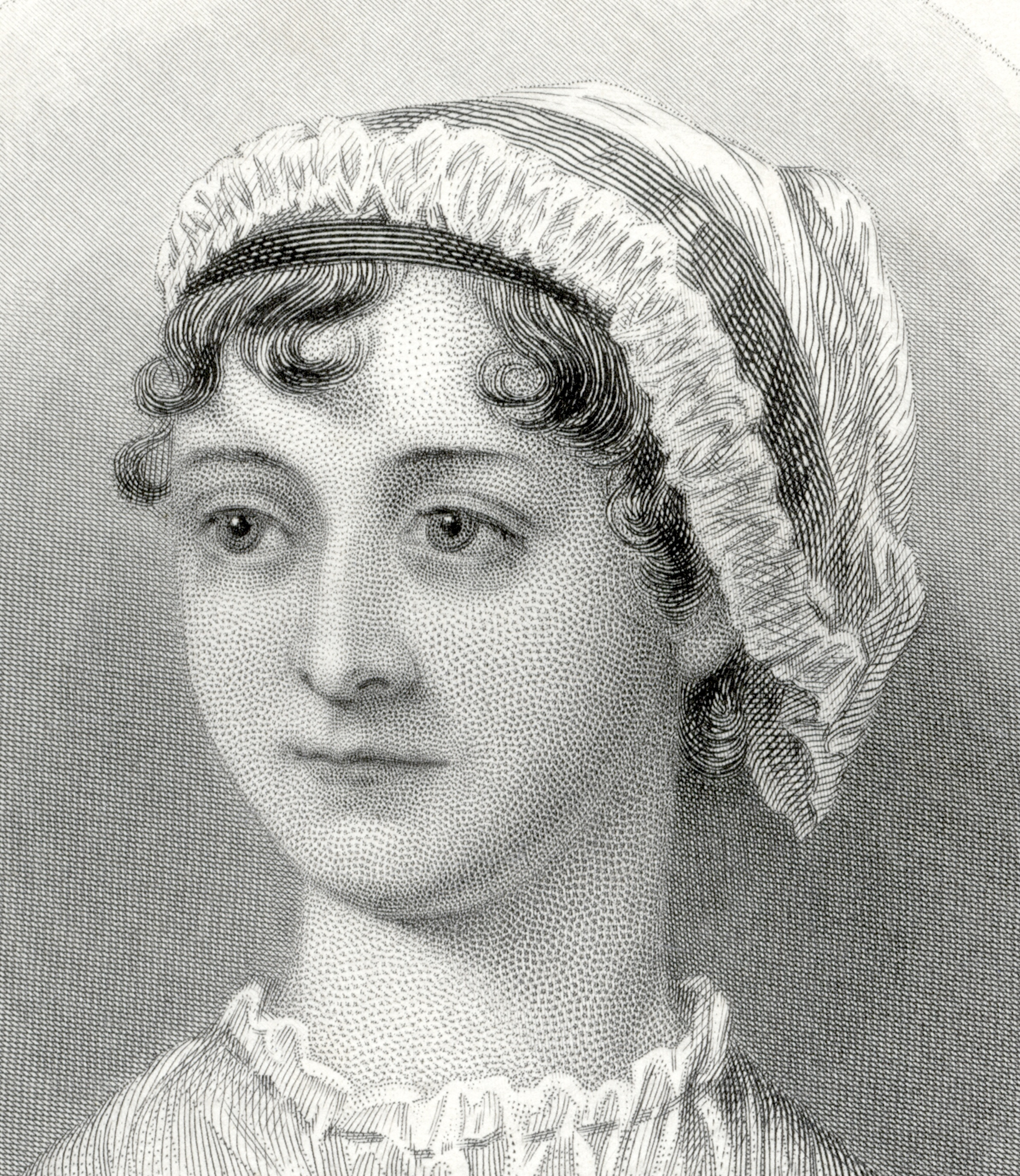
Jane Austen

Major novelists in this period were Jane Austen (1775–1817) and the Scotsman Sir Walter Scott (1771–1832), and Gothic fiction of various kinds also flourished. Austen's works satirise the novels of sensibility of the second half of the 18th century and are part of the transition to 19th-century realism. Austen's works include Pride and Prejudice (1813) Sense and Sensibility (1811), Mansfield Park (1814), Emma (1815) and Persuasion (1818).

The most important British novelist at the beginning of the early 19th century was Sir Walter Scott, who was not only a highly successful British novelist, but "the greatest single influence on fiction in the 19th century...[and] a European figure". Scott's novel writing career was launched in 1814 with Waverley, often called the first historical novel, and was followed by Ivanhoe. The Waverley Novels, including The Antiquary, Old Mortality, The Heart of Midlothian, and whose subject is Scottish history, are now generally regarded as Scott's masterpieces.

== Victorian literature: 1837–1900 ==
=== Victorian fiction ===
==== The novel ====
It was in the Victorian era (1837–1900) that the novel became the leading literary genre in English. Women played an important part in this rising popularity both as authors and as readers. Monthly serialising of fiction encouraged this surge in popularity, due to a combination of the rise of literacy, technological advances in printing, and improved economics of distribution. Circulating libraries, that allowed books to be borrowed for an annual subscription, were a further factor in the rising popularity of the novel.

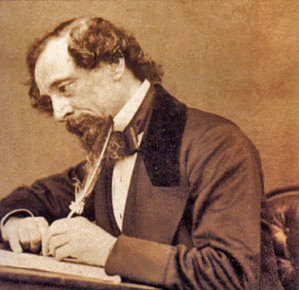
Charles Dickens

Charles Dickens (1812–70) emerged on the literary scene in the late 1830s and soon became probably the most famous novelist in the history of British literature. Dickens fiercely satirised various aspects of society, including the workhouse in Oliver Twist, the failures of the legal system in Bleak House. In more recent years, Dickens has been most admired for his later novels, such as Dombey and Son (1846–1848), Bleak House (1852–1853) and Little Dorrit (1855–1857), Great Expectations (1860–1861), and Our Mutual Friend (1864–1865).

An early rival to Dickens was William Makepeace Thackeray (1811–1863), who during the Victorian period ranked second only to him, but he is now much less read and is known almost exclusively for Vanity Fair (1847).

The Brontë sisters, Emily, Charlotte and Anne, were other significant novelists in the 1840s and 1850s. Their novels caused a sensation when they were first published and subsequently were accepted as classics. Charlotte Brontë's (1816–1855) work was Jane Eyre, broke new ground in being written from an intensely first-person female perspective. Emily Brontë's (1818–1848) novel was Wuthering Heights and, according to Juliet Gardiner, "the vivid sexual passion and power of its language and imagery impressed, bewildered and appalled reviewers". The third Brontë novel of 1847 was Anne Brontë's (1820–1849) Agnes Grey, which deals with the lonely life of a governess.

Elizabeth Gaskell (1810–1865) was also a successful writer and North and South contrasts the lifestyle in the industrial north of England with the wealthier south.

Anthony Trollope (1815–1882) was one of the more successful, prolific and respected English novelists of the Victorian era. Some of his works are set in the imaginary west country county of Barsetshire, including The Warden (1855) and Barchester Towers (1857). Trollope's novels portray the lives of the landowning and professional classes of early Victorian England.

George Eliot (Mary Ann Evans (1819–1880) was a major novelist of the mid-Victorian period. Her works, especially Middlemarch 1871–1872), are important examples of literary realism, and they are admired for their combination of high Victorian literary detail, with an intellectual breadth that removes them from the narrow geographic confines they often depict, leading to comparisons with Tolstoy.

George Meredith (1828–1909) is best remembered for his novels The Ordeal of Richard Feverel (1859) and The Egoist (1879). "His reputation stood very high well into" the 20th century but then seriously declined.

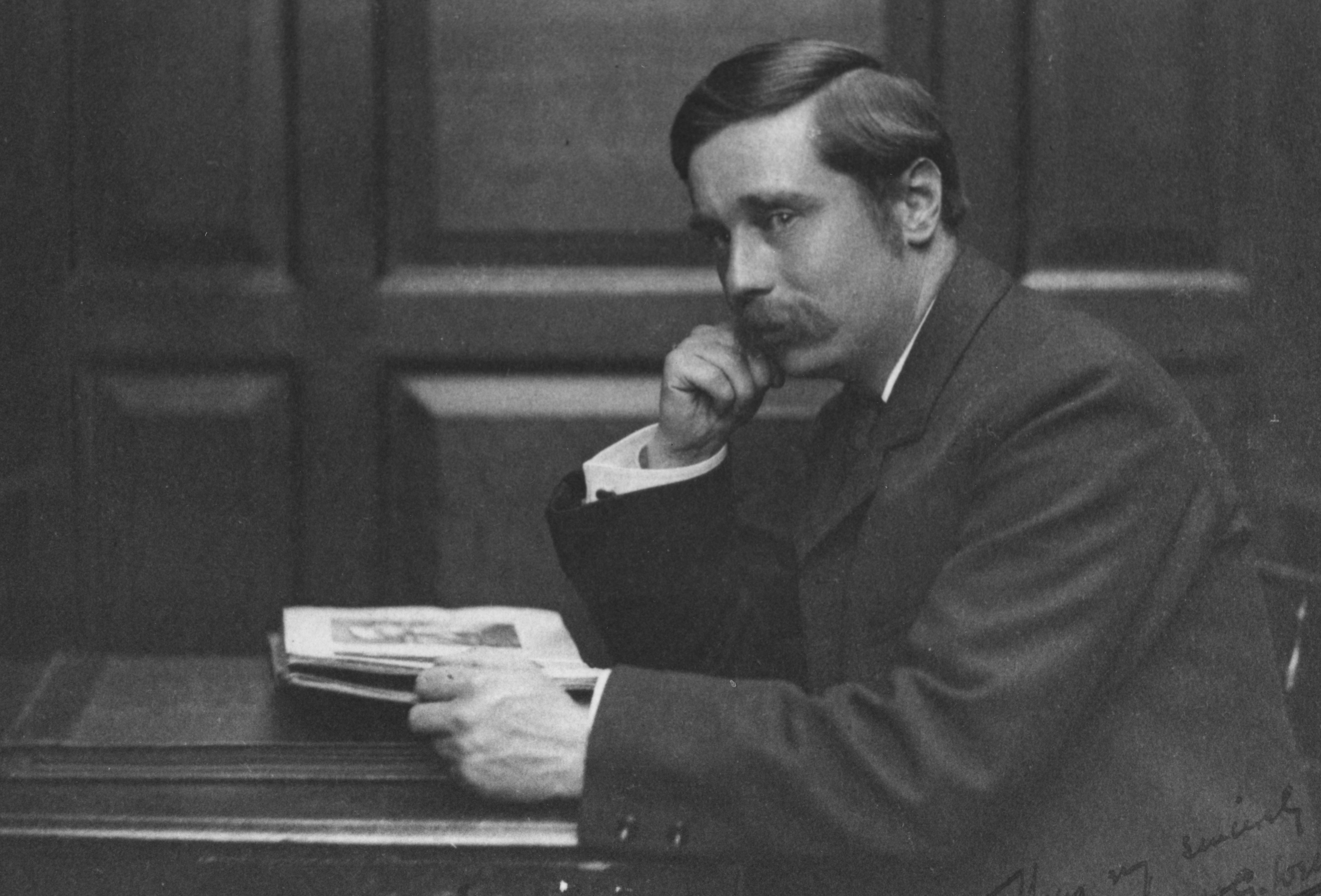
H. G. Wells studying in London, taken c. 1890

An interest in rural matters and the changing social and economic situation of the countryside is seen in the novels of Thomas Hardy (1840–1928). A Victorian realist, in the tradition of George Eliot, he was also influenced both in his novels and poetry by Romanticism, especially by William Wordsworth. He gained fame as the author of such novels as, Far from the Madding Crowd (1874), The Mayor of Casterbridge (1886), Tess of the d'Urbervilles (1891), and Jude the Obscure (1895).

Another significant late 19th-century novelist is George Gissing (1857–1903), who published 23 novels from 1880 to 1903. His best-known novel is New Grub Street (1891).

Also in the late 1890s, the Polish-born writer Joseph Conrad (1857–1924), an important forerunner of modernist literature, began publishing his first novels. Conrad's Heart of Darkness was published in 1899. Joseph Conrad's Heart of Darkness (1899) is an important example about the changing times during Queen Victoria's reign, signaling the transition from realism to modernism. While Conrad's depiction of the local Africans in his novel is often criticized as deeply dehumanizing (for example, Chinua Achebe in "An Image of Africa: Racism in Conrad's Heart of Darkness"), others argue that this xenophobic characterization belongs to the fictional narrator (Charles Marlow), and that Conrad seeks to blur the lines between societies, demonstrating the ambiguity and darkness inherent in each. Another major novel of Conrad's published towards the end of the Victorian era was Lord Jim (1900). Considered one of his masterpieces, Lord Jim also makes use of the narration of the character Marlow to tell the story of a disgraced young sailor who seeks to make amends for abandoning a steamer and its passengers during its moment of need. Lord Jim has also been praised for its innovative psychological exploration of cowardice, self knowledge, and personal growth, as well as its experimental narrative structure anticipating literary modernism. As with Heart of Darkness, the novel has also been notable for casting doubts on the assumptions of the colonial order of the day.

==== The short story ====
There are early European examples of short stories published separately from 1790 to 1810, but the first true collections of short stories appeared from 1810 to 1830 in several countries around the same period. The early short stories in the United Kingdom were gothic tales like Richard Cumberland's "remarkable narrative" "The Poisoner of Montremos" (1791). Major novelists like Sir Walter Scott and Charles Dickens also wrote some short stories.

==== Genre fiction ====
Important developments occurred in genre fiction in this era.

Adventure novels were popular, including Sir John Barrow's descriptive 1831 account of the Mutiny on the Bounty. The Lost World literary genre was inspired by real stories of archaeological discoveries by imperial adventurers. Sir Henry Rider Haggard wrote King Solomon's Mines, one of the early examples, in 1885. Contemporary European politics and diplomatic manoeuvrings informed Anthony Hope's swashbuckling Ruritanian adventure novels The Prisoner of Zenda (1894). Robert Louis Stevenson (1850–1894) also wrote works in this genre, including Kidnapped (1886), an historical novel set in the aftermath of the Jacobite rising of 1745, and Treasure Island (1883), the classic pirate adventure.

Wilkie Collins' epistolary novel The Moonstone (1868) is generally considered the first detective novel in the English language, and soon after Sir Arthur Conan Doyle began his Sherlock Holmes series about a London-based "consulting detective". Doyle wrote four novels and 56 short stories featuring Holmes, from 1880 to 1907, with a final case in 1914.

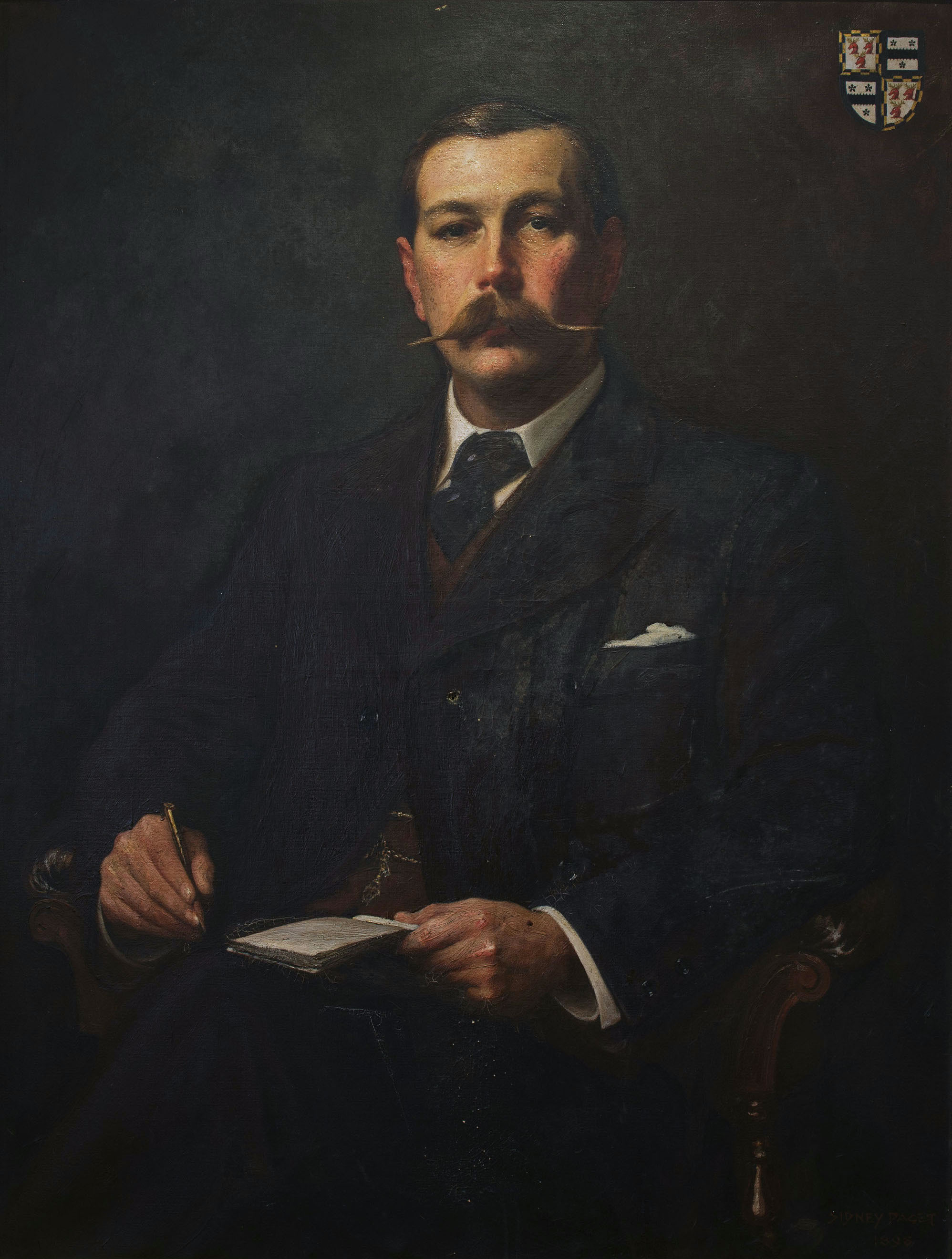
Sir Arthur Conan Doyle was born in Scotland.

H. G. Wells's (1866–1946) writing career began in the 1890s with science fiction novels like The War of the Worlds (1898), which describes an invasion of late Victorian England by Martians, and Wells is, along with Frenchman Jules Verne (1828–1905), as a major figure in the development of the science fiction genre.

The history of the modern fantasy genre is generally said to begin with George MacDonald, the influential author of The Princess and the Goblin and Phantastes (1858). William Morris was a popular English poet who also wrote several fantasy novels during the latter part of the 19th century. The vampire genre fiction began with John William Polidori's "The Vampyre" (1819). This short story was inspired by the life of Lord Byron and his poem The Giaour. Irish writer Bram Stoker was the author of seminal horror work Dracula (1897) with the primary antagonist the vampire Count Dracula.

Penny dreadful publications were an alternative to mainstream works, and were aimed at working class adolescents, introducing the infamous Sweeney Todd. The premier ghost story writer of the 19th century was the Irish writer Sheridan Le Fanu.

==== Children's literature ====
Lewis Carroll

Literature for children developed as a separate genre during the Victorian era, and some works became internationally known, such as Lewis Carroll, Alice's Adventures in Wonderland (1865). At the end of 19th century, the author and illustrator Beatrix Potter was known for her children's books, which featured animal characters, including The Tale of Peter Rabbit (1902). In the latter years of the 19th century, precursors of the modern picture book were illustrated books of poems and short stories produced by illustrators Randolph Caldecott, Walter Crane, and Kate Greenaway. These had a larger proportion of pictures to words than earlier books, and many of their pictures were in colour. Vice Versa (1882) by F. Anstey, sees a father and son exchange bodies – body swaps have been a popular theme in various media since the book was published.

=== Victorian poetry ===
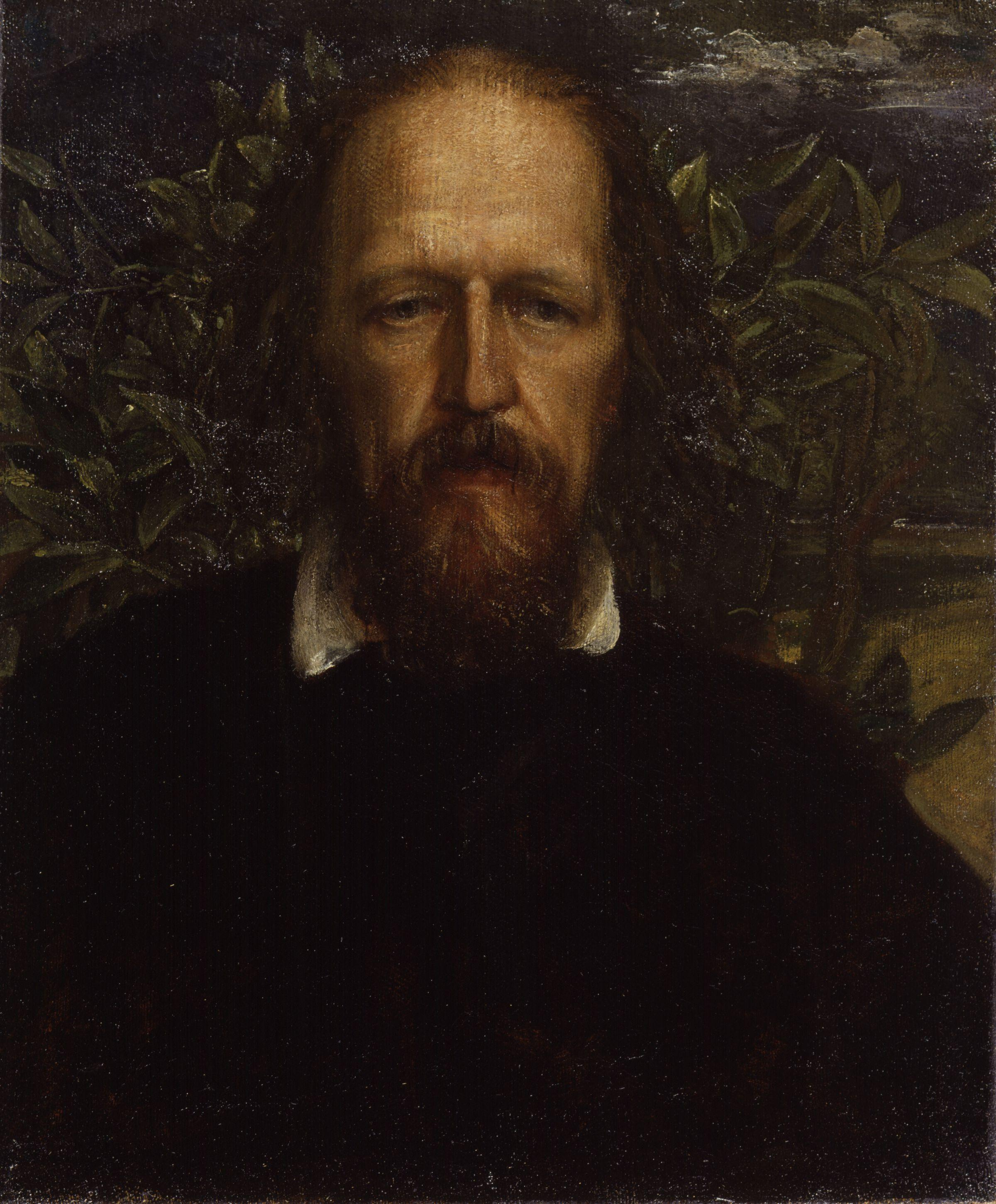
Alfred, Lord Tennyson

The leading poets during the Victorian period were Alfred, Lord Tennyson (1809–1892), Robert Browning (1812–1889), Elizabeth Barrett Browning (1806–1861), and Matthew Arnold (1822–1888). The poetry of this period was heavily influenced by the Romantics, but went off in its own directions. Particularly notable was the development of the dramatic monologue, a form used by many poets in this period, but perfected by Browning.

Tennyson was Poet Laureate of the United Kingdom during much of Queen Victoria's reign. He was described by T.S. Eliot, as "the greatest master of metrics as well as melancholia", and as having "the finest ear of any English poet since Milton".

While Elizabeth Barrett Browning was the wife of Robert Browning, she had established her reputation as a major poet before she met him. Her famous work is the sequence of 44 sonnets "Sonnets from the Portuguese", published in Poems (1850). Matthew Arnold's reputation as a poet has declined in recent years, and he is best remembered now for his critical works, like Culture and Anarchy (1869) and his 1867 poem "Dover Beach".

Dante Gabriel Rossetti (1828–1882) was a poet, illustrator, painter and translator. He founded the Pre-Raphaelite Brotherhood in 1848 with William Holman Hunt and John Everett Millais, and was later to be the main inspiration for a second generation of artists and writers influenced by the movement, notably William Morris and Edward Burne-Jones.

While Arthur Clough (1819–61) was a minor figure of this era, he has been described as "a fine poet whose experiments in extending the range of literary language and subject were ahead of his time".

George Meredith (1828–1909) is remembered for his innovative collection of poems Modern Love (1862).

In the second half of the century, English poets began to take an interest in French Symbolism. Two groups of poets emerged in the 1890s, the Yellow Book poets who adhered to the tenets of Aestheticism, including Algernon Charles Swinburne, Oscar Wilde and Arthur Symons and the Rhymers' Club group, that included Ernest Dowson, Lionel Johnson and Irishman William Butler Yeats. Irishman Yeats went on to become an important modernist in the 20th century. Also in the 1890s A. E. Housman (1859–1936) published at his own expense A Shropshire Lad. The poems' wistful evocation of doomed youth in the English countryside, in spare language and distinctive imagery, appealed strongly to late Victorian and Edwardian taste.

The nonsense verse of Edward Lear, along with the novels and poems of Lewis Carroll, is regarded as a precursor of surrealism. In 1846, Lear published A Book of Nonsense, a volume of limericks that went through three editions and helped popularise the form.

Writers of comic verse included the dramatist, librettist, poet and illustrator W. S. Gilbert (1836–1911), who is best known for his 14 comic operas produced in collaboration with the composer Sir Arthur Sullivan, of which the famous include H.M.S. Pinafore, The Pirates of Penzance and The Mikado.

=== Victorian drama ===
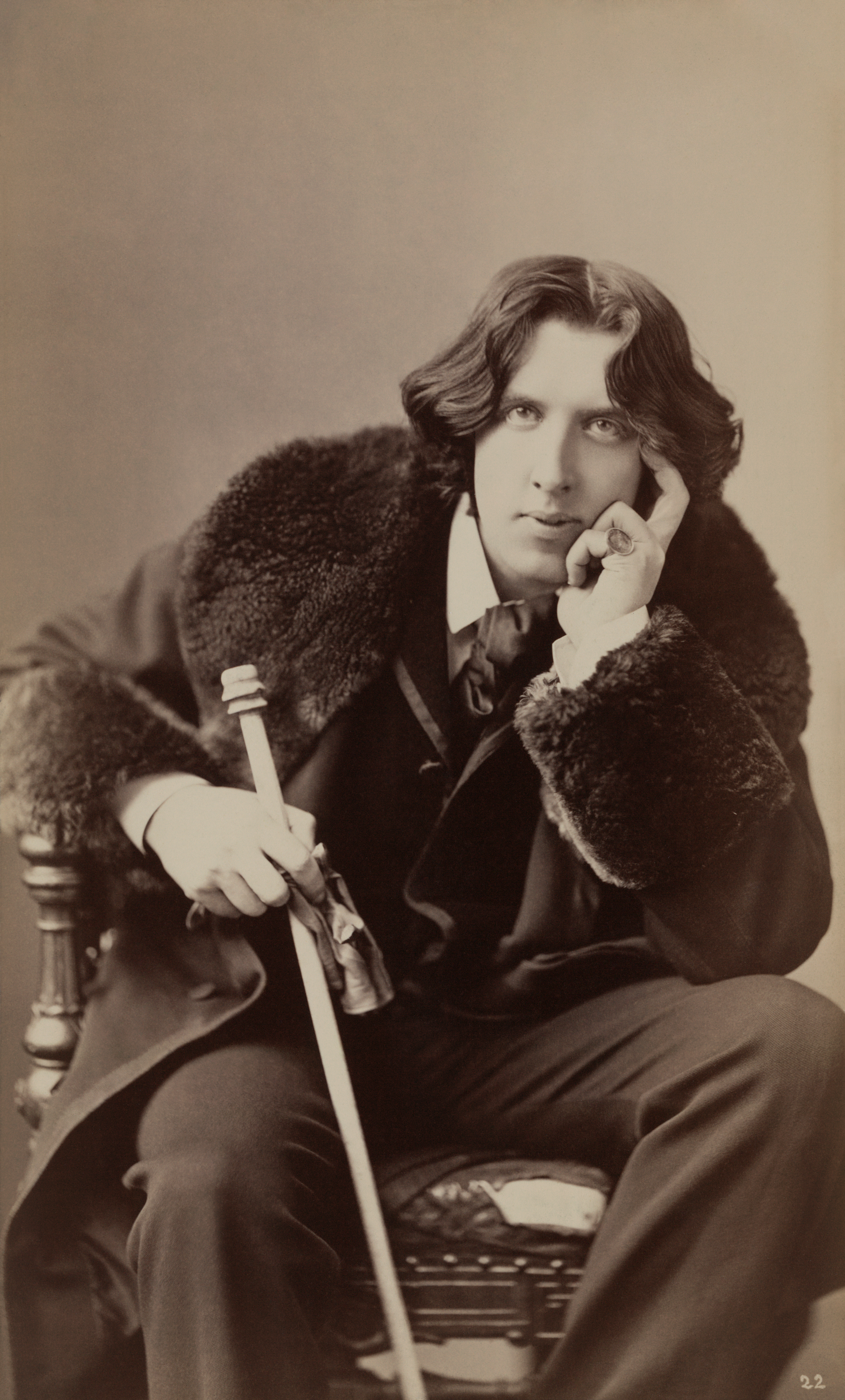
Oscar Wilde, 1882

For much of the first half of the 19th century, drama in London and provincial theatres was restricted by a licensing system to the Patent theatre companies, and all other theatres could perform only musical entertainments (although magistrates had powers to license occasional dramatic performances). The passing of the Theatres Act 1843 removed the monopoly on drama held by the Patent theatres.

Irish playwright Dion Boucicault (1820–90) was an extremely popular writer of comedies who achieved success on the London stage with works like London Assurance, (1841), in the middle of the 19th century. However, drama did not achieve importance as a genre in the 19th century until the end of the century, and then the main figures were also Irish-born. In the last decade of the century major playwrights emerged, including George Bernard Shaw (1856–1950), Arms and the Man (1894), and Oscar Wilde (1854–1900), The Importance of Being Earnest (1895). Both of these Irish writers lived mainly in England and wrote in English, with the exception of some works in French by Wilde.

== 20th century ==
The year 1922 marked a significant change in the relationship between Great Britain and Ireland, with the setting up of the (predominantly Catholic) Irish Free State in most of Ireland, and the predominantly Protestant Northern Ireland remained part of the United Kingdom. This separation also leads to questions as to what extent Irish writing prior to 1922 should be treated as a colonial literature. There are also those who question whether the literature of Northern Ireland is Irish or British. Nationalist movements in Britain, especially in Wales and Scotland, also significantly influenced writers in the 20th and 21st centuries.

=== Modernism and cultural revivals: 1901–1945 ===
From around 1910 the Modernist movement began to influence British literature. While their Victorian predecessors had usually been happy to cater to mainstream middle-class taste, 20th-century writers often felt alienated from it, so responded by writing more intellectually challenging works or by pushing the boundaries of acceptable content.

==== Edwardian fiction ====
The short but influential Edwardian era emerged with the death of Queen Victoria in 1901 and continued until the First World War. During this time, the world was introduced to cozy and puckish animal characters of Beatrix Potter along with the eternally youthful antics of Peter Pan (J. M. Barrie). A. A. Milne also began to write during this time, but his beloved Winnie the Pooh would not be published until 1926. Rudyard Kipling's Just So Stories For Little Children (1902) was a successful followup to his earlier adventures with Mowgli and The Jungle Book (1894).

Other exemplary novels of the time take on an optimistic but critical tone, including E. M. Forster's A Room with a View (1908). Here, Forster satirizes the classism and xenophobia of Victorian England, using his own travel experiences to question the "ingrained bias[es]" of the previous century. The Women's Suffrage Movement was also gaining momentum during this era and fiction reflected these ideas. More than ever, fictional women were protagonists (not just supporting roles), and they often crossed social and geographical boundaries through marriage or the pursuit of knowledge.

Joseph Conrad, who started writing during the Victorian era, continued to produce important novels into the Edwardian period. Nostromo (1904), long regarded as one of his finest novels, deals with the corrupting impact about wealth on a revolutionary society in a fictional South American country.

==== First World War ====
The experiences of the First World War were reflected in the work of war poets such as Wilfred Owen, Rupert Brooke, Isaac Rosenberg, Robert Graves, and Siegfried Sassoon. In Parenthesis, an epic poem by David Jones first published in 1937, is a notable work of the literature of the First World War, that was influenced by Welsh traditions, despite Jones being born in England. In non-fiction prose T. E. Lawrence's (Lawrence of Arabia) autobiographical account in Seven Pillars of Wisdom of the Arab Revolt against the Ottoman Empire is important.

==== Poetry: 1901–1945 ====
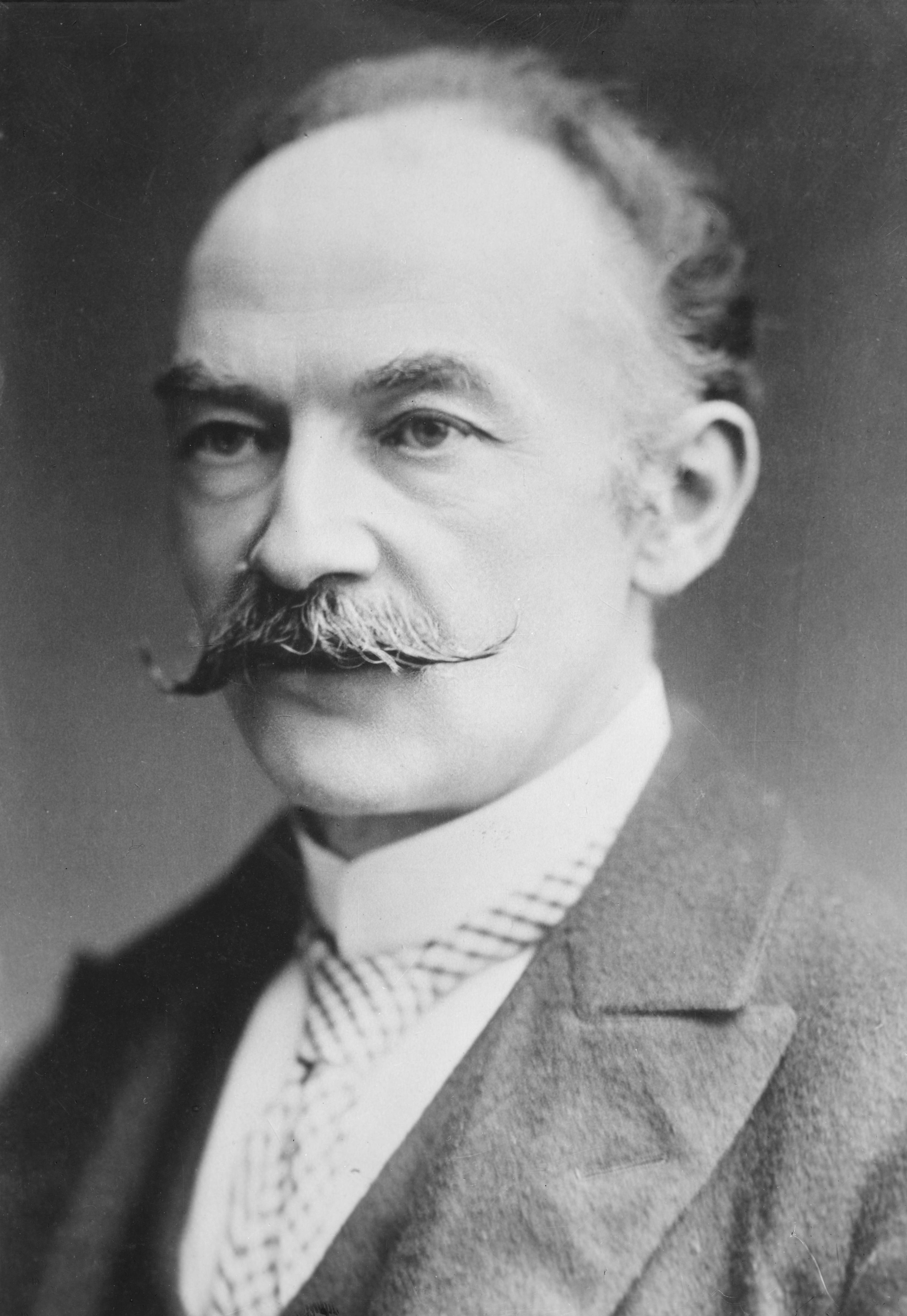
Thomas Hardy

Thomas Hardy (1840–1928) and Gerard Manley Hopkins (1844–1889), two Victorian poets who published little in the 19th century, have come to be regarded as major poets. While Hardy first established his reputation the late 19th century with novels, he wrote poetry throughout his career. However he did not publish his first collection until 1898, so that he tends to be treated as a 20th-century poet. Gerard Manley Hopkins's Poems were posthumously published in 1918 by Robert Bridges.

Free verse and other stylistic innovations came to the forefront in this era, with which T.S. Eliot and Ezra Pound were especially associated. T. S. Eliot (1888–1965) was born American, migrating to England in 1914, and he was "arguably the most important English-language poet of the 20th century." He produced some of the best-known poems in the English language, including "The Waste Land" (1922) and Four Quartets (1935–1942).

The Georgian poets like Rupert Brooke, Walter de la Mare (1873–1956) and John Masefield (1878–1967, Poet Laureate from 1930) maintained a conservative approach to poetry by combining romanticism, sentimentality and hedonism. Edward Thomas (1878–1917) is sometimes treated as another Georgian poet.

In the 1930s the Auden Group, sometimes called simply "the Thirties poets", was an important group of politically left-wing writers, that included W.H. Auden (1907–73) and Cecil Day-Lewis (1904–1972) and Louis MacNeice (1907–1963). Auden was a major poet who had a similar influence on subsequent poets as W.B. Yeats and T.S. Eliot had had on earlier generations.

Keith Douglas (1920–1944) was noted for his war poetry during World War II and his wry memoir of the Western Desert Campaign, Alamein to Zem Zem. He was killed in action during the invasion of Normandy. Alun Lewis (1915–1944), born in South Wales, was a prominent English-language poet of the war The Second World War has remained a theme in British literature.

==== Modernist novel ====
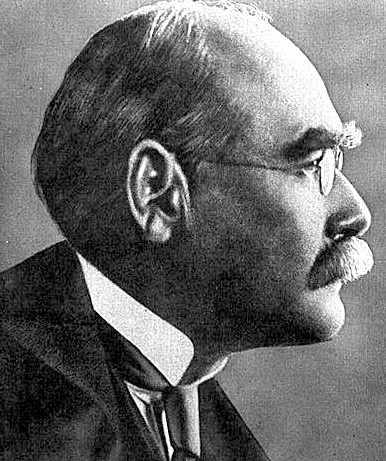
Rudyard Kipling, 1912

While modernism was to become an important literary movement in the early decades of the new century, there were also many fine writers who, like Thomas Hardy, were not modernists. Novelists include: Rudyard Kipling (1865–1936), who was also a successful poet; H. G. Wells (1866–1946); John Galsworthy (1867–1933), (Nobel Prize in Literature, 1932), whose novels include The Forsyte Saga (1906–1921); Arnold Bennett (1867–1931) author of The Old Wives' Tale (1908); G. K. Chesterton (1874–1936); E. M. Forster (1879–1970). The most popular British writer of the early years of the 20th century was arguably Rudyard Kipling, a highly versatile writer of novels, short stories and poems, and to date the youngest ever recipient of the Nobel Prize for Literature (1907).

H. G. Wells was a highly prolific author who is now best known for his work in the science fiction genre. His notable science fiction works include The War of the Worlds, and The Time Machine, written in the 1890s. Forster's A Passage to India 1924, reflected challenges to imperialism, and his earlier works such as A Room with a View (1908) and Howards End (1910) examined the restrictions and hypocrisy of Edwardian society in England.

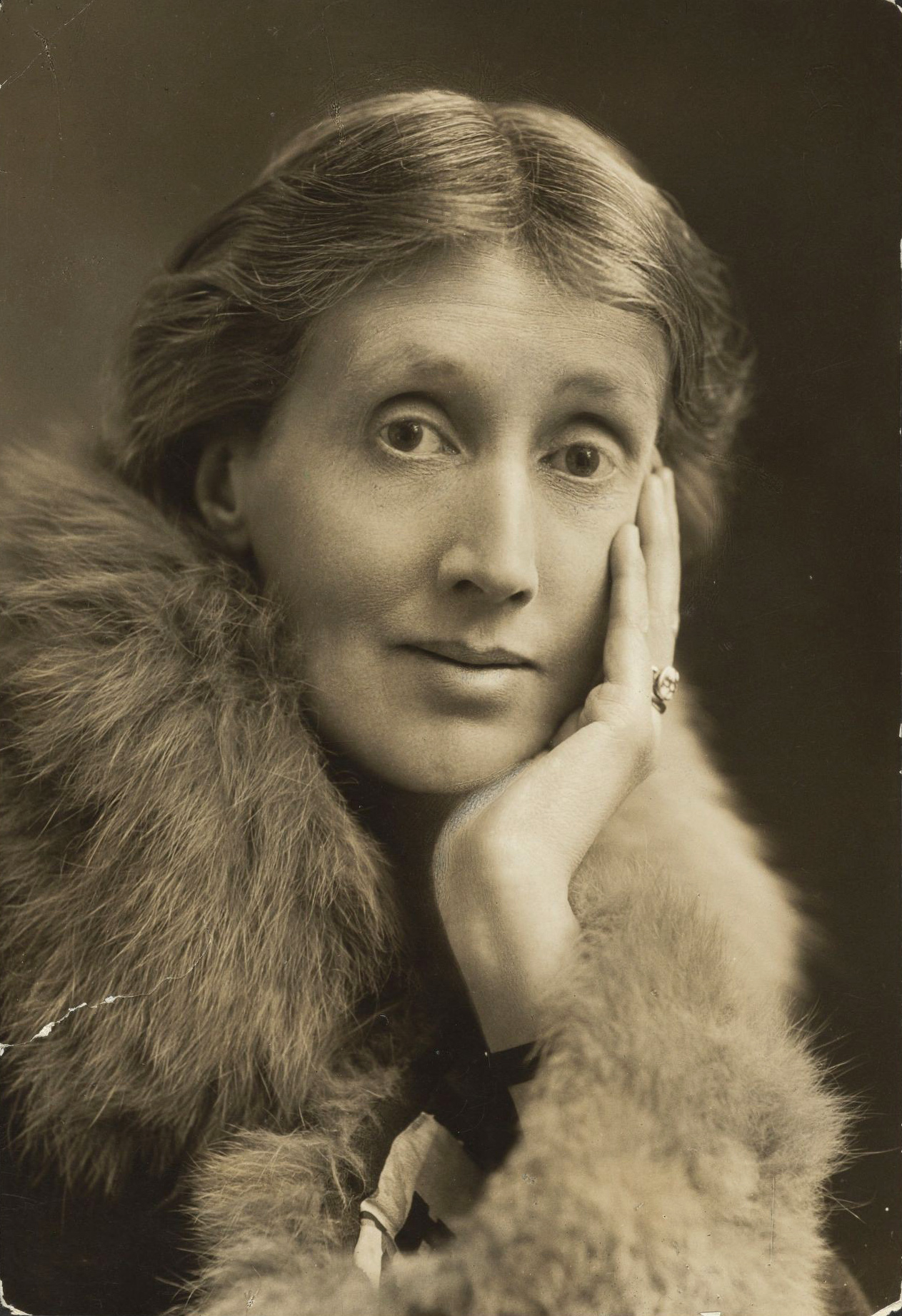
Virginia Woolf in 1927

Writing in the 1920s and 1930s Virginia Woolf was an influential feminist and a major stylistic innovator associated with the stream-of-consciousness technique. Her novels include Mrs Dalloway 1925, and The Waves 1931, and A Room of One's Own 1929, which contains her famous dictum: "A woman must have money and a room of her own if she is to write fiction". Woolf and E. M. Forster were members of the Bloomsbury Group, an enormously influential group of English writers, intellectuals, philosophers and artists.

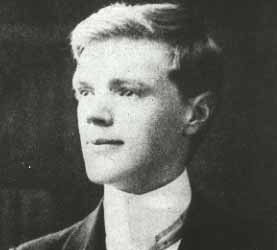
D. H. Lawrence, 1906

Other early modernists were Dorothy Richardson (1873–1957), whose novel Pointed Roof (1915), is one of the early example of the stream of consciousness technique and D. H. Lawrence (1885–1930), who wrote with understanding about the social life of the lower and middle classes, and the personal life of those who could not adapt to the social norms of his time. Sons and Lovers 1913, is widely regarded as his earliest masterpiece. There followed The Rainbow in 1915 and its sequel Women in Love in 1920.

An important development, beginning really in the 1930s and 1940s, was a tradition of working class novels that were actually written by writers who had a working-class background.

An essayist and novelist, George Orwell's works are considered important social and political commentaries of the 20th century, dealing with issues such as poverty in The Road to Wigan Pier (1937) and in the 1940s, his satires of totalitarianism included Animal Farm (1945). Malcolm Lowry published in the 1930s, and he is best known for Under the Volcano (1947). Evelyn Waugh satirised the "bright young things" of the 1920s and 1930s, notably in A Handful of Dust and Decline and Fall, and his novel Brideshead Revisited has a theological basis, aiming to examine the effect of divine grace on its main characters. Aldous Huxley (1894–1963) published his famous dystopia Brave New World in 1932, the same year as John Cowper Powys's A Glastonbury Romance. In 1938, Graham Greene's (1904–1991) first major novel Brighton Rock was published.

=== Late modernism: 1946–2000 ===
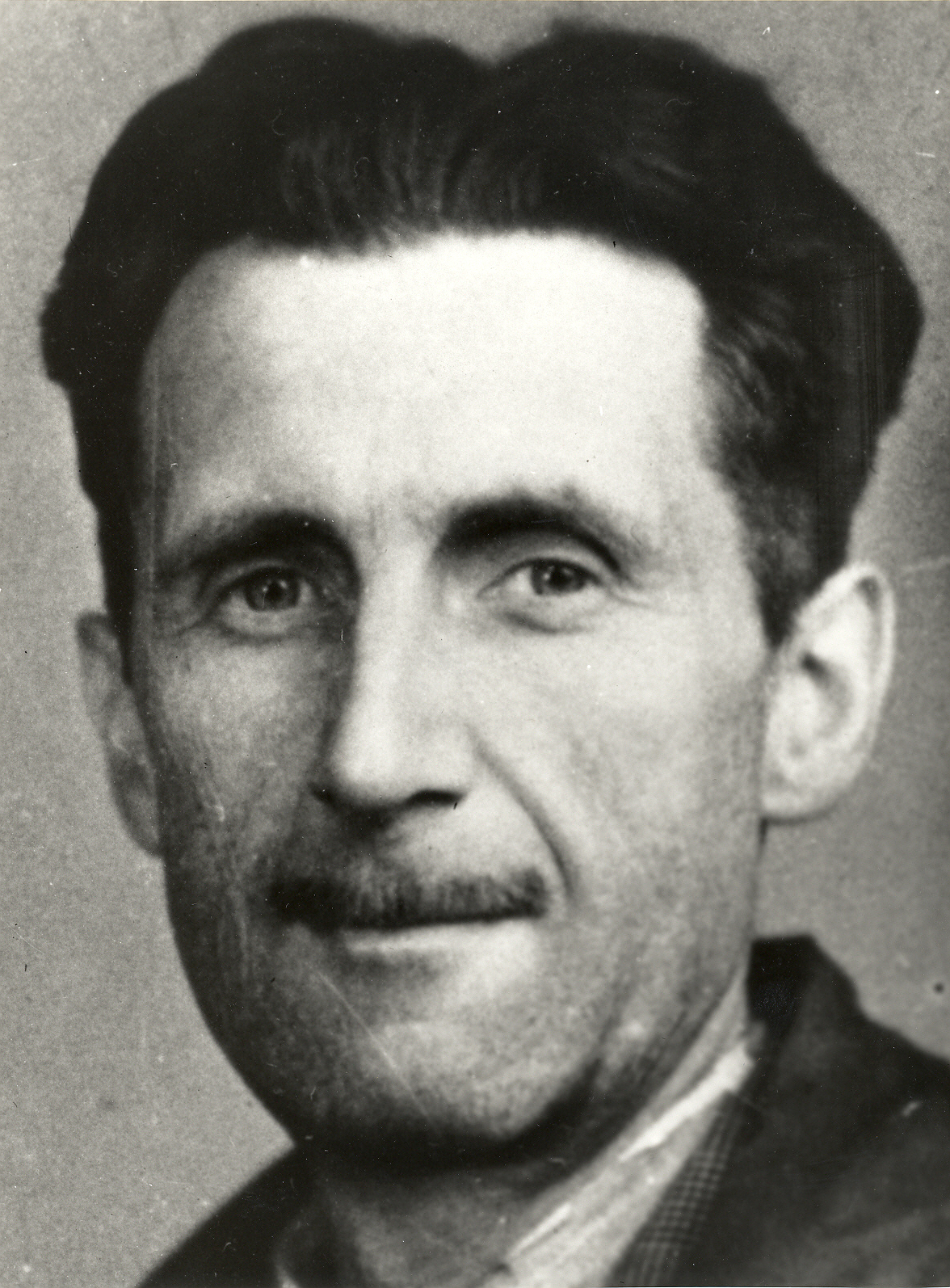
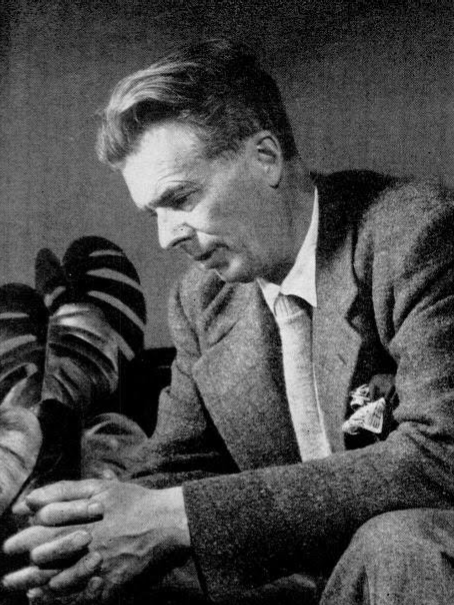
George Orwell (left) and Aldous Huxley (right)

Though some have seen modernism ending by around 1939, with regard to English literature, "When (if) modernism petered out and postmodernism began has been contested almost as hotly as when the transition from Victorianism to modernism occurred". In fact a number of modernists were still living and publishing in the 1950s and 1960, including T.S. Eliot, Dorothy Richardson and John Cowper Powys. Furthermore, Northumberland poet Basil Bunting, born in 1900, published little until Briggflatts in 1965.

==== Novel ====
In 1947 Malcolm Lowry published Under the Volcano. George Orwell's Nineteen Eighty-Four was published in 1949. An essayist and novelist, Orwell's works are important social and political commentaries of the 20th century. Evelyn Waugh's Second World War trilogy Sword of Honour (1952–1961) was published in this period.

Graham Greene's works span the 1930s to the 1980s. He was a convert to Catholicism, and his novels explore the ambivalent moral and political issues of the modern world. Other novelists writing in the 1950s and later were: Anthony Powell, A Dance to the Music of Time; Nobel Prize laureate Sir William Golding; philosopher Dame Iris Murdoch, whose novels deal with sexual relationships, morality, and the power of the unconscious; and Scottish novelist Muriel Spark, The Prime of Miss Jean Brodie (1961). Anthony Burgess is remembered for his dystopian novel A Clockwork Orange 1962. Mervyn Peake (1911–1968) published his Gothic fantasy Gormenghast trilogy from 1946 to 1959. Angela Carter (1940–1992) was a novelist and journalist, known for her feminist, magical realism, and picaresque works.

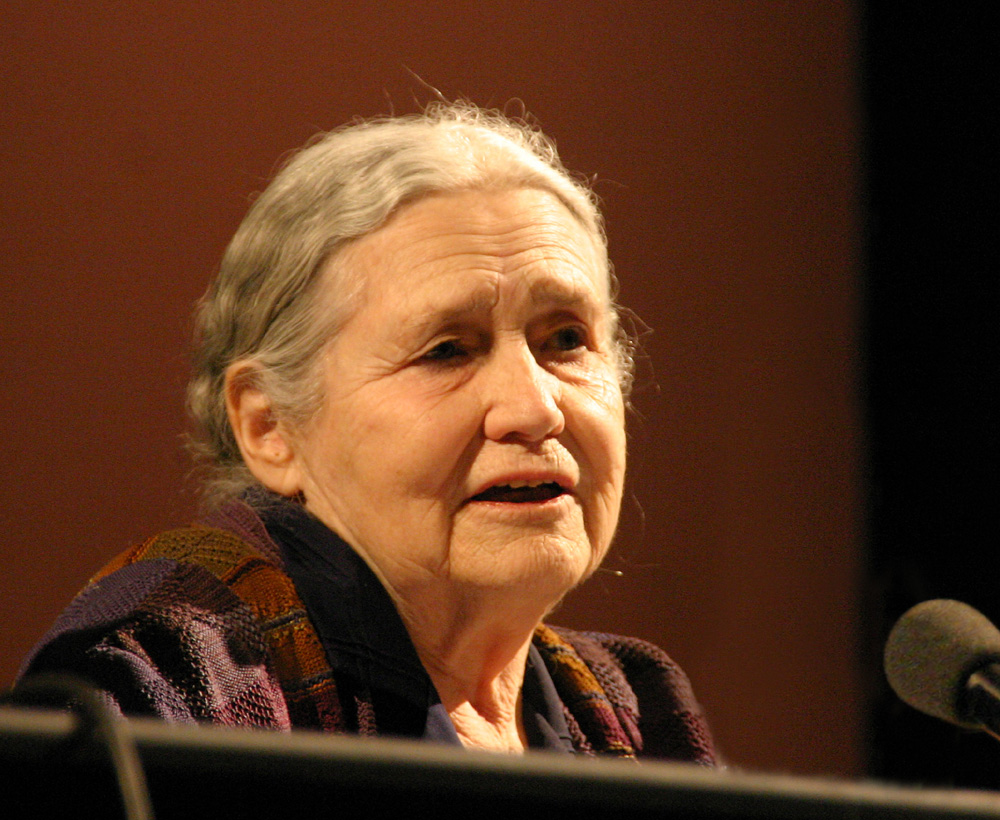
Doris Lessing, Cologne, 2006

Sir Salman Rushdie is among a number of writers from former British colonies who permanently settled in Britain. Rushdie achieved fame with Midnight's Children (1981). His controversial novel The Satanic Verses (1989) was inspired in part by the life of Muhammad.

Doris Lessing from Southern Rhodesia (now Zimbabwe) published her first novel The Grass Is Singing in 1950 after immigrating to England. She initially wrote about her African experiences. Lessing soon became a dominant presence in the English literary scene, publishing frequently, and she won the Nobel Prize for Literature in 2007. Sir V. S. Naipaul (1932–2018) was another immigrant, born in Trinidad, who won the Nobel Prize in Literature. Also from the West Indies is George Lamming (1927–2022) who wrote In the Castle of My Skin (1953), and from Pakistan came Hanif Kureishi (1954–), a playwright, screenwriter, filmmaker, novelist and short story writer. 2017 Nobel Prize winner Kazuo Ishiguro (1954– ) was born in Japan, but his parents immigrated to Britain when he was age 6, and he became a British citizen as an adult. Martin Amis (1949–2023) was one of the prominent British novelists of the end of the 20th, beginning of the 21st century. Pat Barker (1943–) has won many awards for her fiction. English novelist and screenwriter Ian McEwan (1948– ) is a highly regarded writer.

==== Drama ====
An important cultural movement in the British theatre that developed in the late 1950s and early 1960s was Kitchen sink realism (or kitchen sink drama), art, novels, film, and television plays. The term angry young men was often applied members of this artistic movement. It used a style of social realism which depicts the domestic lives of the working class to explore social issues and political issues. The drawing room plays of the post war period, typical of dramatists like Sir Terence Rattigan and Sir Noël Coward, were challenged in the 1950s in plays like John Osborne's Look Back in Anger (1956).

Again in the 1950s, the Theatre of the Absurd profoundly affected British dramatists, especially Irishman Samuel Beckett's play Waiting for Godot. Among those influenced were Harold Pinter (1930–2008), (The Birthday Party, 1958), and Tom Stoppard (1937– ) (Rosencrantz and Guildenstern Are Dead,1966).

The Theatres Act 1968 abolished the system of censorship of the stage that had existed in Great Britain since 1737. The new freedoms of the London stage were tested by Howard Brenton's The Romans in Britain, first staged at the National Theatre during 1980, and subsequently the focus of an unsuccessful private prosecution in 1982.

Other playwrights whose careers began later in the century are Sir Alan Ayckbourn (Absurd Person Singular, 1972), Michael Frayn (1933–) playwright and novelist, David Hare (1947– ), David Edgar (1948– ). Dennis Potter's more distinctive dramatic work was produced for television.

During the 1950s and 1960s, many major British playwrights either effectively began their careers with the BBC, or had works adapted for radio. Many major British playwrights in fact, either effectively began their careers with the BBC, or had works adapted for radio, including Caryl Churchill and Tom Stoppard whose "first professional production was in the fifteen-minute Just Before Midnight programme on BBC Radio, which showcased new dramatists". John Mortimer made his radio debut as a dramatist in 1955, with his adaptation of his own novel Like Men Betrayed for the BBC Light Programme. Other notable radio dramatists included Brendan Behan and novelist Angela Carter.

Among the more famous works created for radio, are Dylan Thomas's Under Milk Wood (1954), Samuel Beckett's All That Fall (1957), Harold Pinter's A Slight Ache (1959) and Robert Bolt's A Man for All Seasons (1954).

==== Poetry ====
While poets T. S. Eliot, W. H. Auden and Dylan Thomas were still publishing after 1945, new poets started their careers in the 1950s and 1960s, including Philip Larkin (1922–1885) (The Whitsun Weddings,1964) and Ted Hughes (1930–1998) (The Hawk in the Rain, 1957). Northern Ireland has produced a number of significant poets, the most famous being Nobel prize winner Seamus Heaney. However, Heaney regarded himself as Irish and not British. Other poets from Northern Ireland include Derek Mahon, Paul Muldoon, James Fenton, Michael Longley, and Medbh McGuckian.

In the 1960s and 1970s Martian poetry aimed to break the grip of 'the familiar' by describing ordinary things in unfamiliar ways, for example, through the eyes of a Martian. Poets closely associated with it are Craig Raine and Christopher Reid. Martin Amis, an important novelist in the late 20th century, carried into fiction this drive to make the familiar strange. Another literary movement in this period was the British Poetry Revival, a wide-reaching collection of groupings and subgroupings that embraces performance, sound and concrete poetry. Leading poets associated with this movement include J. H. Prynne, Eric Mottram, Tom Raworth, Denise Riley and Lee Harwood. It reacted to the conservative group called "The Movement".

The Liverpool poets were Adrian Henri, Brian Patten and Roger McGough. Their works were self-conscious attempts at creating an English equivalent to the Beats. Tony Harrison (1937–2025), who explored the medium of language and the tension between native dialect (in his case, that of working-class Leeds) and acquired language, and Simon Armitage.

Geoffrey Hill (1932–2016) has been considered to be among the distinguished English poets of his generation, Charles Tomlinson (1927–2015) is another important English poet of an older generation, but "since his first publication in 1951, has built a career that has seen more notice in the international scene than in his native England.

==== Scottish literature ====
Scotland has in the late 20th century produced several important novelists, including James Kelman who like Samuel Beckett can create humour out of grim situations; A. L. Kennedy whose 2007 novel Day was named Book of the Year in the Costa Book Awards.; Alasdair Gray whose Lanark: A Life in Four Books (1981) is a dystopian fantasy set in his home town Glasgow.

Highly anglicised Lowland Scots is often used in contemporary Scottish fiction, for example, the Edinburgh dialect of Lowland Scots used in Trainspotting by Irvine Welsh to give a brutal depiction of the lives of working class Edinburgh drug users. In Northern Ireland, James Fenton's poetry is written in contemporary Ulster Scots. The poet Michael Longley (born 1939) has experimented with Ulster Scots for the translation of Classical verse, as in his 1995 collection The Ghost Orchid.

=== Genre fiction ===
==== Early 20th century ====
Among significant writers in this genre in the early 20th century were Erskine Childers' The Riddle of the Sands (1903), who wrote spy novels, Emma Orczy (Baroness Orczy) author of The Scarlet Pimpernel, an historical romance which recounted the adventures of a member of the English gentry in the French Revolutionary period. The title character established the notion of a "hero with a secret identity" into popular culture. John Buchan wrote adventure novels like Prester John (1910). Novels featuring a gentleman adventurer were popular between the wars, exemplified by the series of H. C. McNeile with Bulldog Drummond (1920), and Leslie Charteris, whose many books chronicled the adventures of Simon Templar, alias The Saint. The medieval scholar M. R. James wrote highly regarded ghost stories in contemporary settings.

This was called 'the Golden Age of Detective Fiction'. Dame Agatha Christie, a writer of crime novels, short stories and plays, is best remembered for her 80 detective novels and her successful West End theatre plays. Other female writers in the genre of crime fiction include Dorothy L. Sayers (gentleman detective, Lord Peter Wimsey), Margery Allingham (Albert Campion – supposedly created as a parody of Sayers' Wimsey) and New Zealander Dame Ngaio Marsh (Roderick Alleyn). Georgette Heyer created the historical romance genre and also wrote detective fiction.

A major work of science fiction from the early 20th century is A Voyage to Arcturus by Scottish writer David Lindsay, first published in 1920, and was a central influence on C.S. Lewis's Space Trilogy.

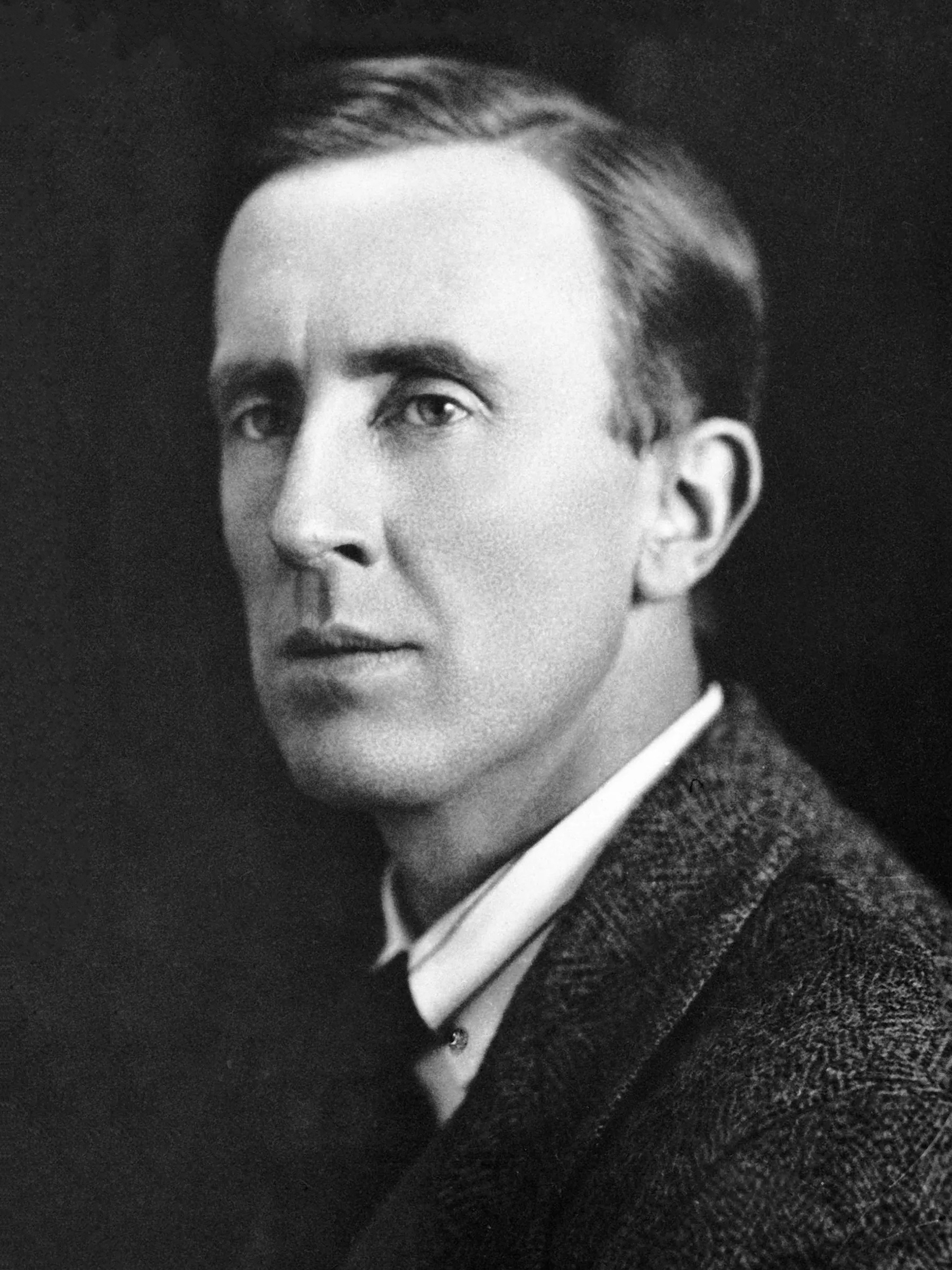
J. R. R. Tolkien

From the early 1930s to late 1940s, an informal literary discussion group associated with the English faculty at the University of Oxford were The Inklings. Its leading members were the major fantasy novelists: J. R. R. Tolkien and C. S. Lewis. Lewis is known for The Screwtape Letters (1942), The Chronicles of Narnia and The Space Trilogy, and Tolkien is known as the author of The Hobbit (1937), The Lord of the Rings, and The Silmarillion.

==== Later 20th century ====
Among important writers of genre fiction in the second half of the 20th century are thriller writer Ian Fleming, creator of James Bond 007. Fleming chronicled Bond's adventures in 12 novels, including Casino Royale (1953).

In contrast to the larger-than-life spy capers of Bond, John le Carré was an author of spy novels who depicted a shadowy world of espionage and counter-espionage, and his best known novel The Spy Who Came in from the Cold (1963) is regarded as prominent in the genre.

Frederick Forsyth writes thriller novels, and Ken Follett writes spy thrillers as well as historical novels, notably The Pillars of the Earth (1989).

War novels include Alistair MacLean thriller's The Guns of Navarone (1957), Where Eagles Dare (1968), and Jack Higgins' The Eagle Has Landed (1975). Patrick O'Brian's nautical historical novels feature the Aubrey–Maturin series set in the Royal Navy.

Ronald Welch's Carnegie Medal winning novel Knight Crusader is set in the 12th century and gives a depiction of the Third Crusade, featuring the Christian leader and King of England Richard the Lionheart. Nigel Tranter also wrote historical novels of celebrated Scottish warriors; Robert the Bruce in The Bruce Trilogy.

The murder mysteries of both Ruth Rendell and P. D. James are popular crime fiction.

===== Science fiction =====
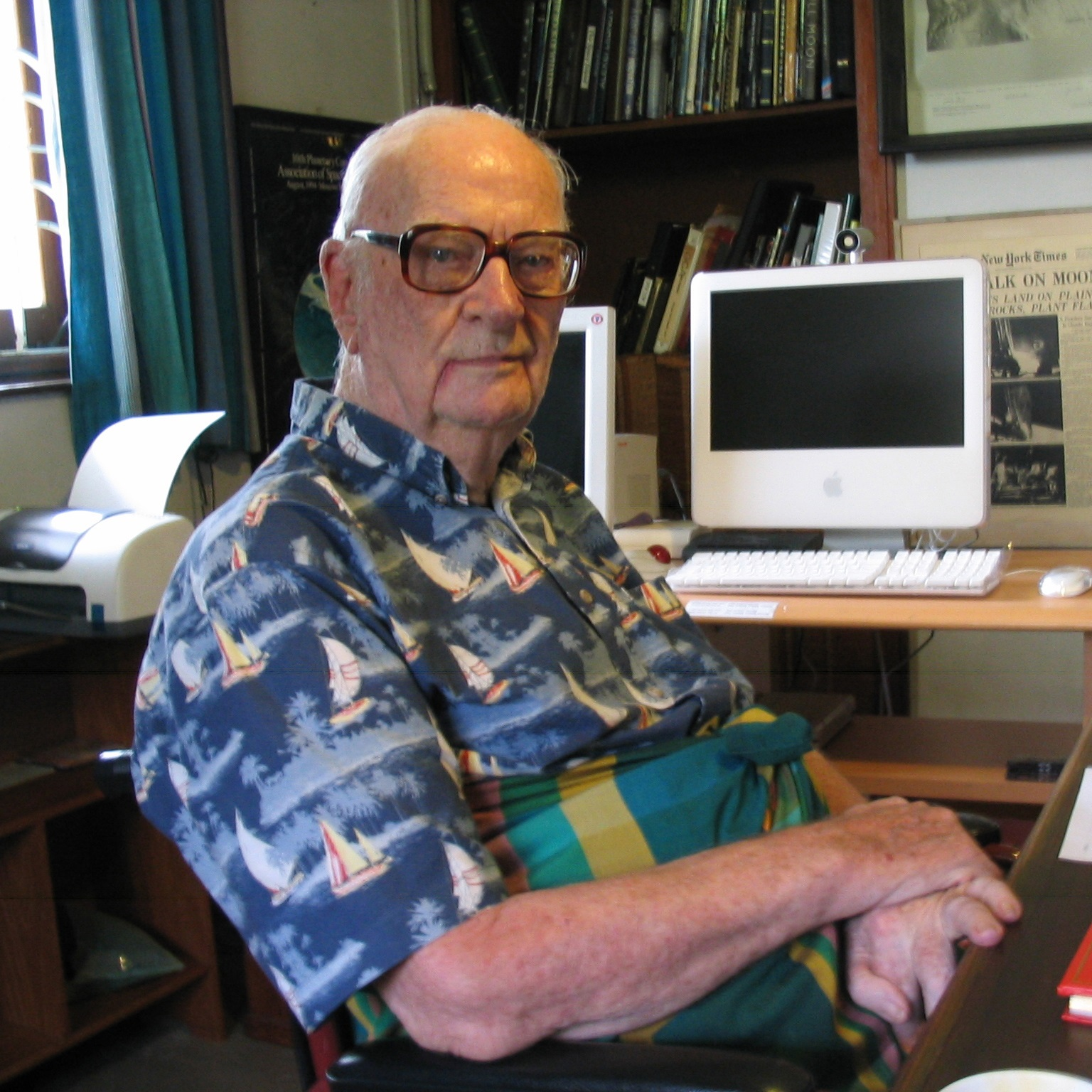
Sir Arthur C. Clarke

John Wyndham wrote post-apocalyptic science fiction, his notable works being The Day of the Triffids (1951), and The Midwich Cuckoos (1957). Other important writers in this genre are Sir Arthur C. Clarke 2001: A Space Odyssey and Brian Aldiss. Michael Moorcock was involved with the 'New Wave' of science fiction writers "part of whose aim was to invest the genre with literary merit" Similarly J. G. Ballard (1930–2009) "became known in the 1960s as the most prominent of the 'New Wave' science fiction writers". A later major figure in science fiction was Iain M. Banks who created a fictional anarchist, socialist, and utopian society the Culture. Nobel prize winner Doris Lessing also published a sequence of five science fiction novels the Canopus in Argos: Archives from 1979 to 1983.

===== Fantasy =====
Sir Terry Pratchett is best known for his Discworld series of comic fantasy novels, that begins with The Colour of Magic (1983), and includes Night Watch (2002). While Neil Gaiman is a writer of both science fiction, and fantasy including Stardust (1998). Douglas Adams is known for his five-volume science fiction comedy series The Hitchhiker's Guide to the Galaxy. J. R. R. Tolkien, arguably the most well-known author in the fantasy genre during the 20th century, is responsible for the creation of The Lord of the Rings (1954) and the wider Tolkien's Legendarium.

=== Literature for children and young adults ===
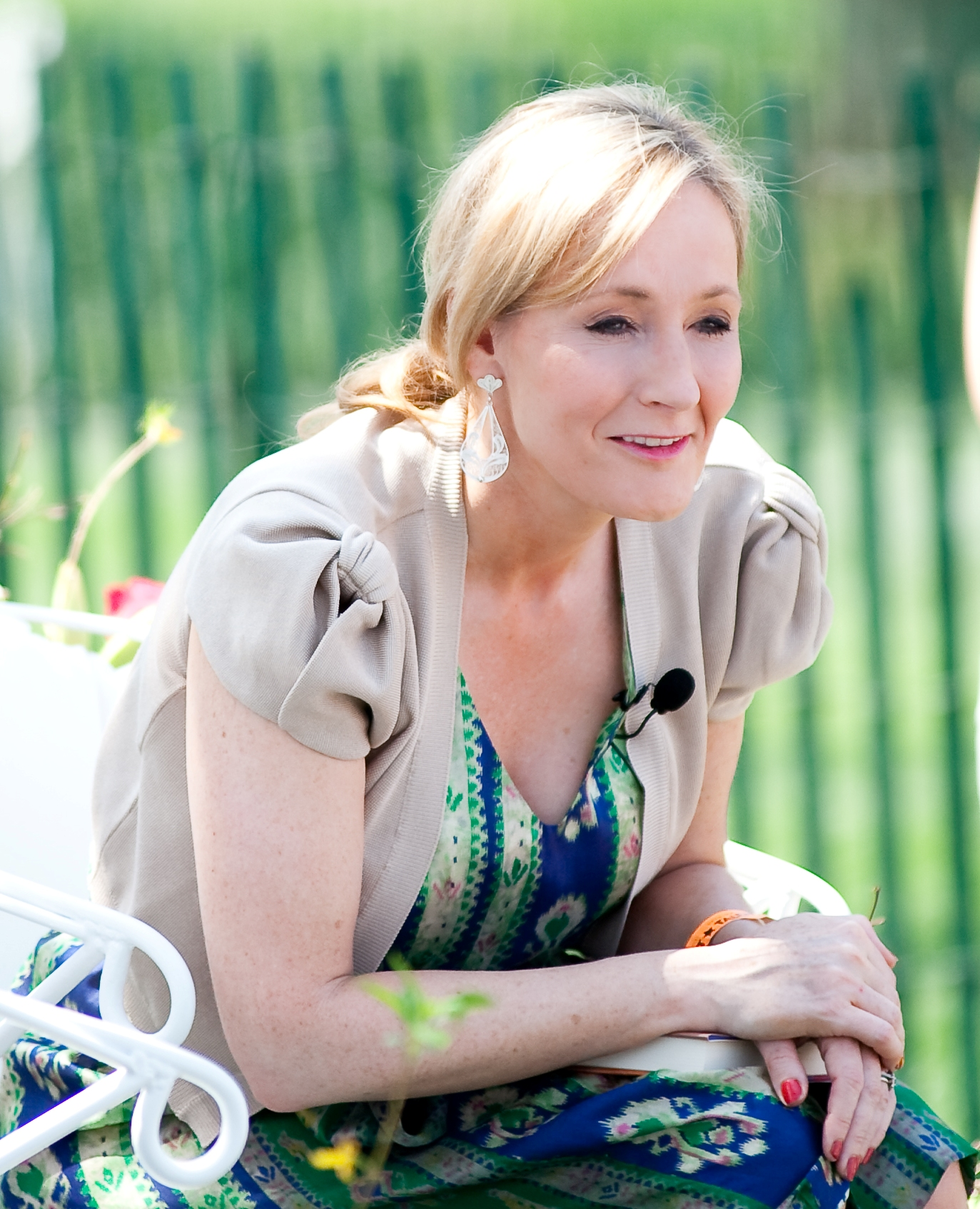
J. K. Rowling, 2010

Significant writers of works for children include, Kenneth Grahame, The Wind in the Willows (1908), Rev. W. Awdry, The Railway Series (1945–2011, A. A. Milne, Winnie-the-Pooh (1926), and P. L. Travers' Mary Poppins. Prolific children's author Enid Blyton chronicled the adventures of a group of young children and their dog in The Famous Five. T. H. White wrote the Arthurian fantasy The Once and Future King, the first part being The Sword in the Stone (1938). Mary Norton wrote The Borrowers series (1952–1982), featuring tiny people who borrow from humans. Inspiration for Frances Hodgson Burnett's novel The Secret Garden was the Great Maytham Hall Garden in Kent. Hugh Lofting created the character Doctor Dolittle who appears in a series of 12 books, and Dodie Smith's The Hundred and One Dalmatians featured the villainous Cruella de Vil.

Roald Dahl is a prominent author of children's fantasy novels, like Charlie and the Chocolate Factory in 1964, which are often inspired from experiences from his childhood, with often unexpected endings, and unsentimental, dark humour. Popular school stories from this period include Ronald Searle's St Trinian's.

J. K. Rowling's Harry Potter fantasy series is a sequence of seven novels that chronicle the adventures of the adolescent wizard Harry Potter; it is the best-selling book series in history. The series has been translated into 67 languages, placing Rowling among the most translated authors in history.

== 21st-century literature ==
=== Novel ===
In the 21st century, an outstanding concern with historical fiction has been noted. Dame Hilary Mantel (1952–2022) was a highly successful writer of historical novels, winning the Booker Prize twice for Wolf Hall 2009 and Bring Up the Bodies. One of the more ambitious novelists to emerge in this period is David Mitchell, whose far-reaching novel Cloud Atlas (2004) spans from the 19th century into the future. Influences from earlier literary styles and techniques in English literature is notable by writers such as Ian McEwan in his 2002 novel Atonement. Zadie Smith was critically acclaimed for her debut novel White Teeth (2000), and for subsequent novels. Julian Barnes (1946– ) is another prominent writer, and he won the 2011 Booker Prize for his book The Sense of an Ending. Kazuo Ishiguro was noted for works such as the dystopian science fiction-novel Never Let Me Go (2005), and he was awarded the 2017 Nobel Prize in Literature for his novels.

=== Theatre ===
The theatrical landscape has been reconfigured, moving from a single national theatre at the end of the 20th century to four as a result of the devolution of cultural policy.

=== Genre fiction ===
E. L. James' erotic romance trilogy Fifty Shades of Grey, Fifty Shades Darker, and Fifty Shades Freed, along with the companion novel Grey: Fifty Shades of Grey as Told by Christian, have sold over 100 million copies globally, and set the record in the United Kingdom as the fastest selling paperback of all time. The perceived success and promotion of genre fiction authors from Scotland provoked controversy in 2009 when James Kelman criticised, in a speech at the Edinburgh International Book Festival, the attention afforded to "upper middle-class young magicians" and "detective fiction" by the "Anglocentric" Scottish literary establishment.

=== Literature for children and young adults ===
Cressida Cowell wrote How to Train Your Dragon, a series of 12 books set in a fictional Viking world. Philip Pullman's is famous for his fantasy trilogy His Dark Materials, which follows the coming-of-age of two children as they wander through a series of parallel universes against a backdrop of epic events.

== Literary institutions ==
Original literature continues to be promoted by institutions such as the Eisteddfod in Wales and the Welsh Books Council. The Royal Society of Edinburgh includes literature within its sphere of activity. Literature Wales is the Welsh national literature promotion agency and society of writers, which administers the Wales Book of the Year award. The imported eisteddfod tradition in the Channel Islands encouraged recitation and performance, a tradition that continues today.

Formed in 1949, the Cheltenham Literature Festival is the longest-running festival of its kind in the world. The Hay Festival in Wales attracts wide interest, and the Edinburgh International Book Festival is the largest festival of its kind in the world.

The Poetry Society publishes and promotes poetry, notably through an annual National Poetry Day. World Book Day is observed in Britain and the Crown Dependencies on the first Thursday in March annually.

=== Literary prizes ===
British recipients of the Nobel Prize in Literature include Rudyard Kipling (1907), John Galsworthy (1932), T.S. Eliot (1948), Bertrand Russell (1950), Winston Churchill (1953), William Golding (1983), V.S. Naipaul (2001), Harold Pinter (2005) Doris Lessing (2007), and Kazuo Ishiguro (2017).

Literary prizes for which writers from the United Kingdom are eligible include:

- Booker Prize
- Commonwealth Writers' Prize
- International Dublin Literary Award
- Carnegie Medal
- Costa Book Awards (formerly the Whitbread Awards)
- Orange Prize for Fiction
- Queen's Gold Medal for Poetry

== See also ==
- British Library
- British regional literature
- Early Modern English
- English poetry
- English drama
- English novel
- List of English novelists
- List of English writers
- Literature of Northern Ireland
- List of writers of Northern Ireland
- LGBTQ literature in the United Kingdom
- Scottish literature
- Scottish poetry
- Theatre of Scotland
- Scottish Renaissance
- History of the Scots language
- List of Scottish writers
- Literature of Shetland
- Theatre of the United Kingdom
- Welsh literature in English
- Welsh poetry
- List of Welsh writers
- Theatre of Wales
- Women's writing in English
- Literature of Birmingham

== Bibliography ==
=== Works cited ===
- Bate, Walter Jackson (1977), Samuel Johnson, New York: Harcourt Brace Jovanovich, ISBN 978-0-15-179260-3
- Bradley, A.C. (1991) [1904]. Shakespearean Tragedy: Lectures on Hamlet, Othello, King Lear and Macbeth. London: Penguin. ISBN 978-0-14-053019-3.
- Dowden, Edward (1881). Shakspere. New York: D. Appleton & Company. OCLC 8164385. OL 6461529M.
- Muir, Kenneth (2005) [1979]. Shakespeare's Tragic Sequence. London: Routledge. ISBN 978-0-415-35325-0.

=== Further reading ===
- Partridge, A. C. Tudor to Augustan English: a Study in Syntax and Style, from Caxton to Johnson, in series, The Language Library. London: A. Deutsch, 1969. 242 p. Without SBN or ISBN
- The Oxford History of English Literature (in 15 vols.) Oxford: Clarendon Press, reprinted 1990–97.
