= Ice cream maker =

Kitchen equipment for making ice cream

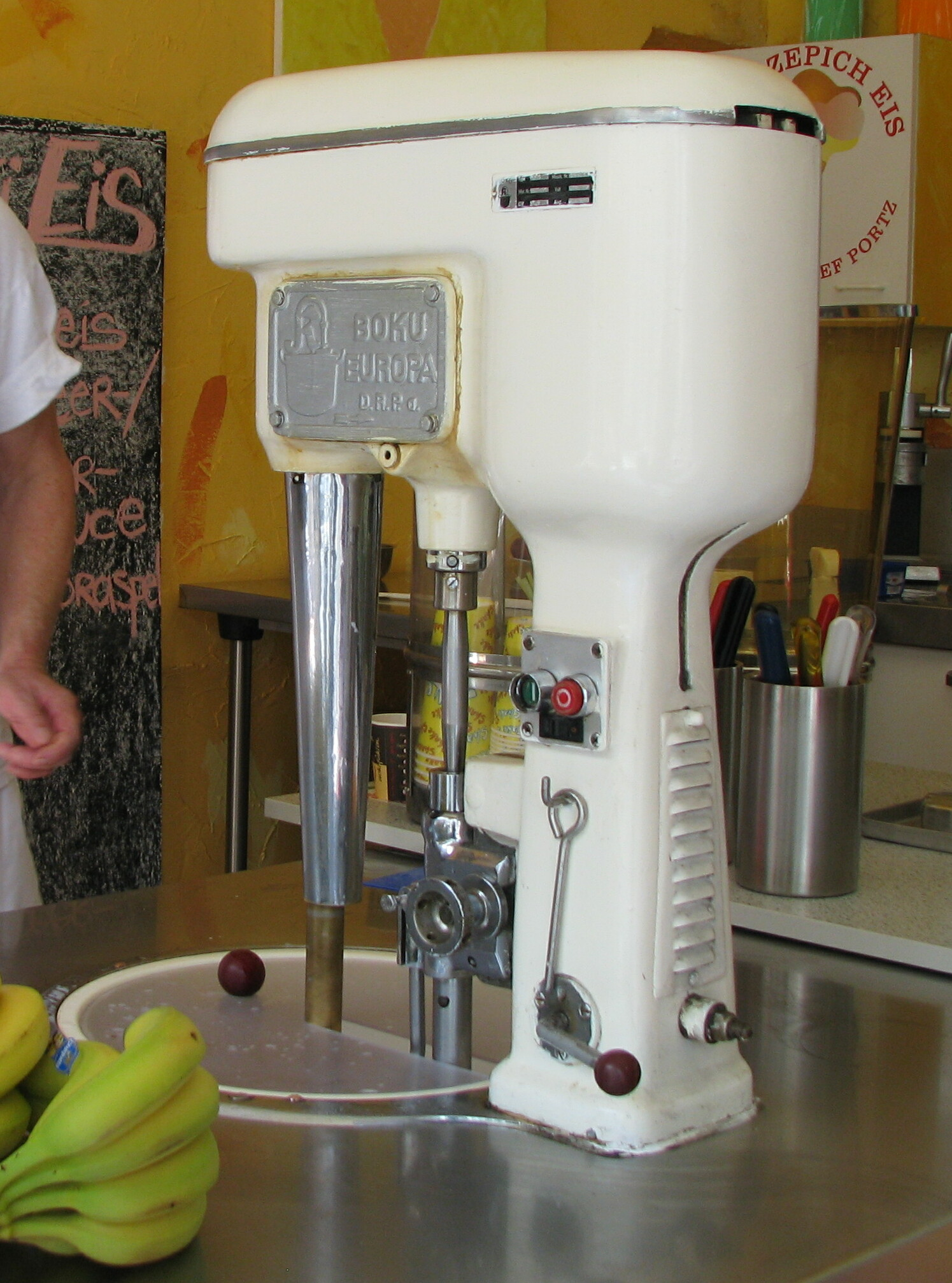
Boku Europa brand ice cream maker

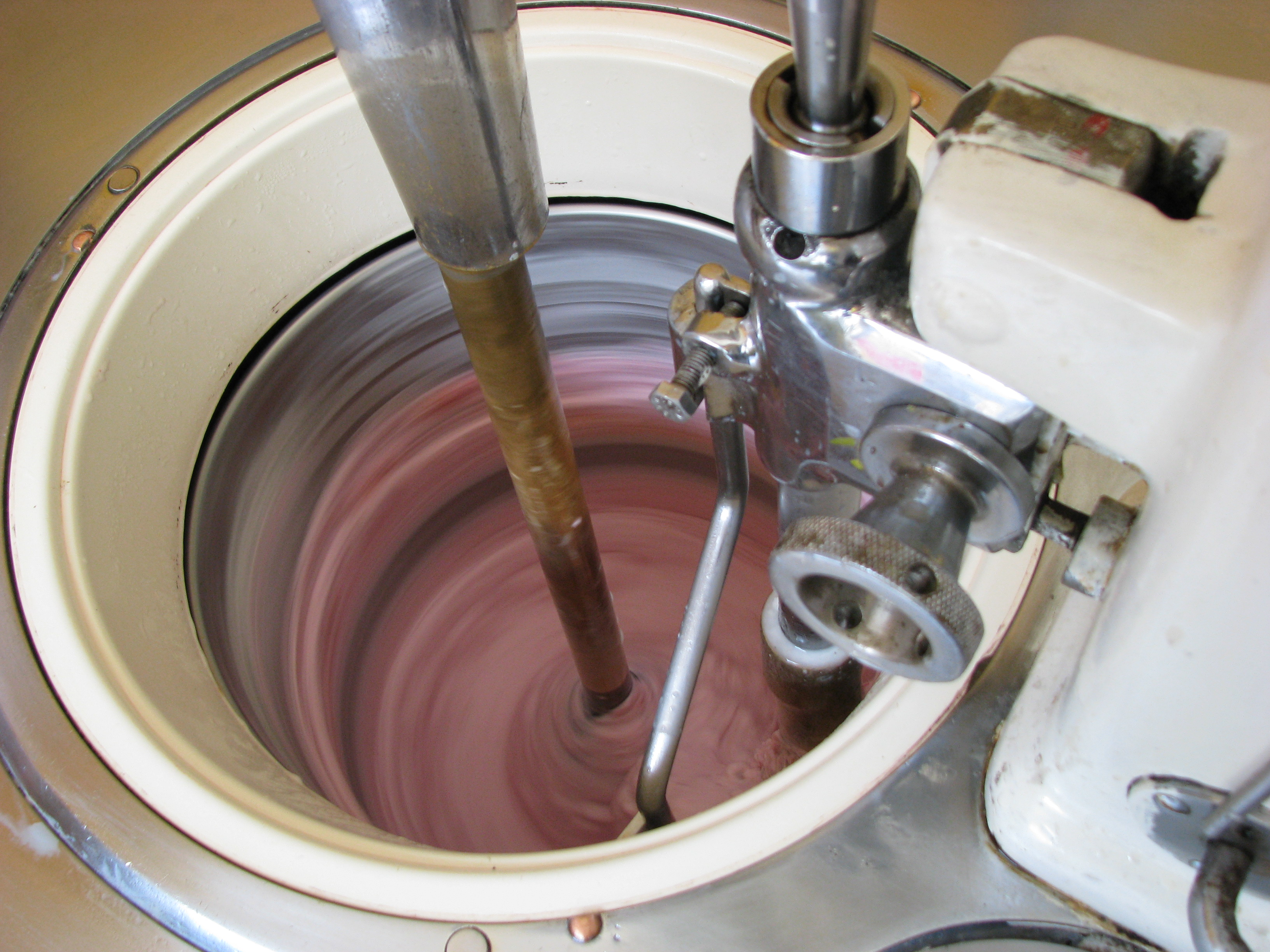
Looking into the preparation of strawberry ice cream

A domestic ice cream maker (commonly referred to as an ice cream machine) is a machine used to make small quantities of ice cream for personal consumption. Ice cream makers may prepare the mixture by employing a hand-crank or by employing an electric motor. The resulting preparation is often chilled through either pre-cooling the machine or by employing a machine that freezes the mixture.

An ice cream maker has to simultaneously freeze the mixture while churning it so as to aerate the mixture and keep the ice crystals small (less than 50 μm). As a result, most ice creams are ready to consume immediately. However, those containing alcohol must often be chilled further to attain a firm consistency.

== History ==
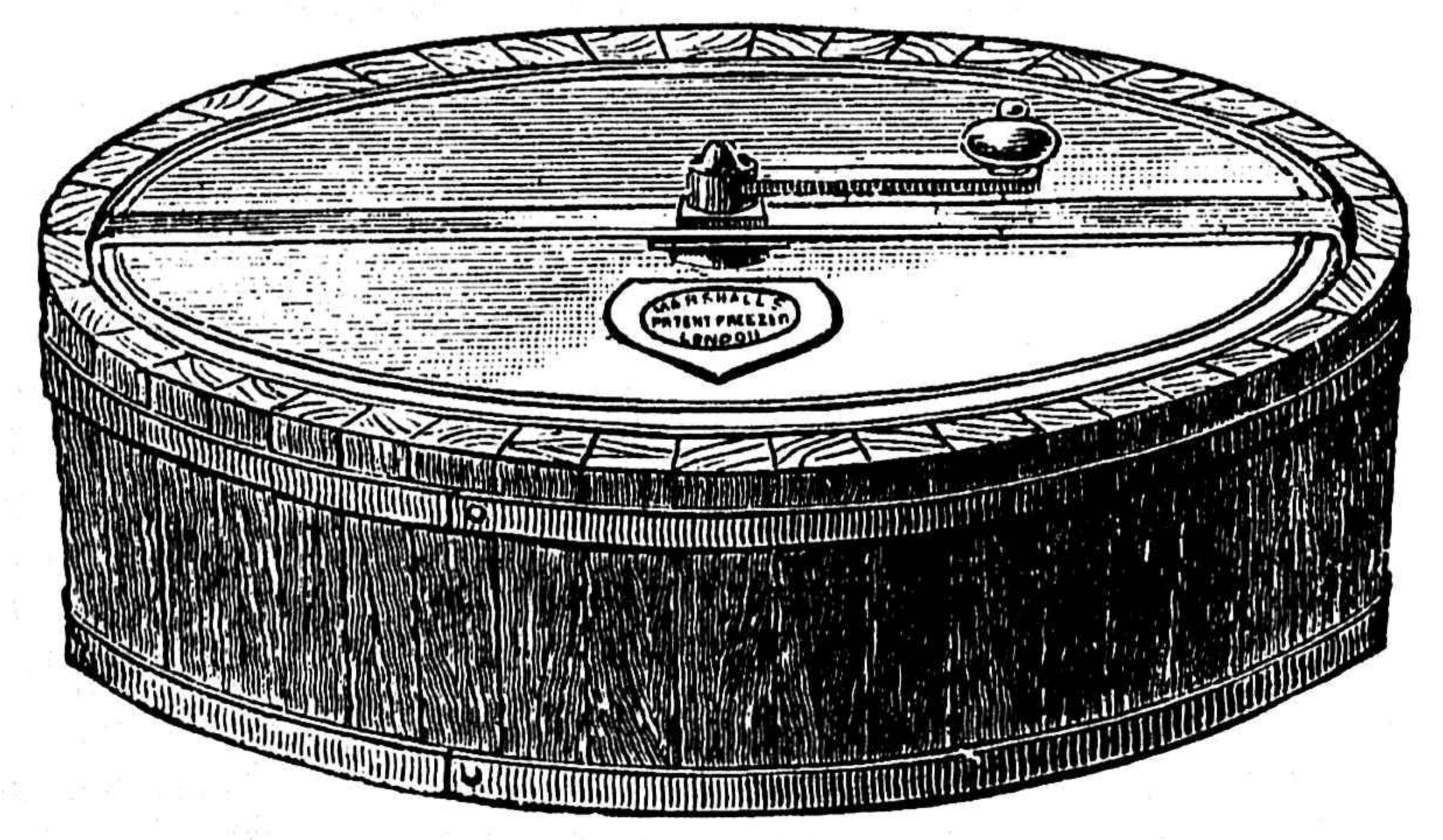
Agnes Marshall's 1885 patented ice cream maker.

Around 1832, Augustus Jackson achieved fame for creating multiple ice cream recipes and pioneering a superior ice cream preparation technique by adding salt to the ice.

In 1843, Nancy M. (Donaldson) Johnson of Philadelphia received the first U.S. patent for a small-scale hand-cranked ice cream freezer. The ice cream freezer was a pewter cylinder.

Dubbed the "Queen of Ices", Victorian English culinary entrepreneur Agnes Marshall was granted a patent for an ice cream machine that could freeze a pint of ice cream in five minutes.

== Process ==
Ice cream makers may prepare the mixture by employing a hand-crank or by employing an electric motor. The resulting preparation is often chilled through either pre-cooling the machine or by employing a machine that freezes the mixture. An ice cream maker has to simultaneously freeze the mixture while churning it so as to aerate the mixture and keep the ice crystals small (less than 50 μm). As a result, most ice creams are ready to consume immediately. However, those containing alcohol must often be chilled further to attain a firm consistency. Some machines—such as certain lower-priced countertop models—require the resulting mixture to be frozen for additional time after churning is complete.

== Models ==
=== Hand-cranked machines ===
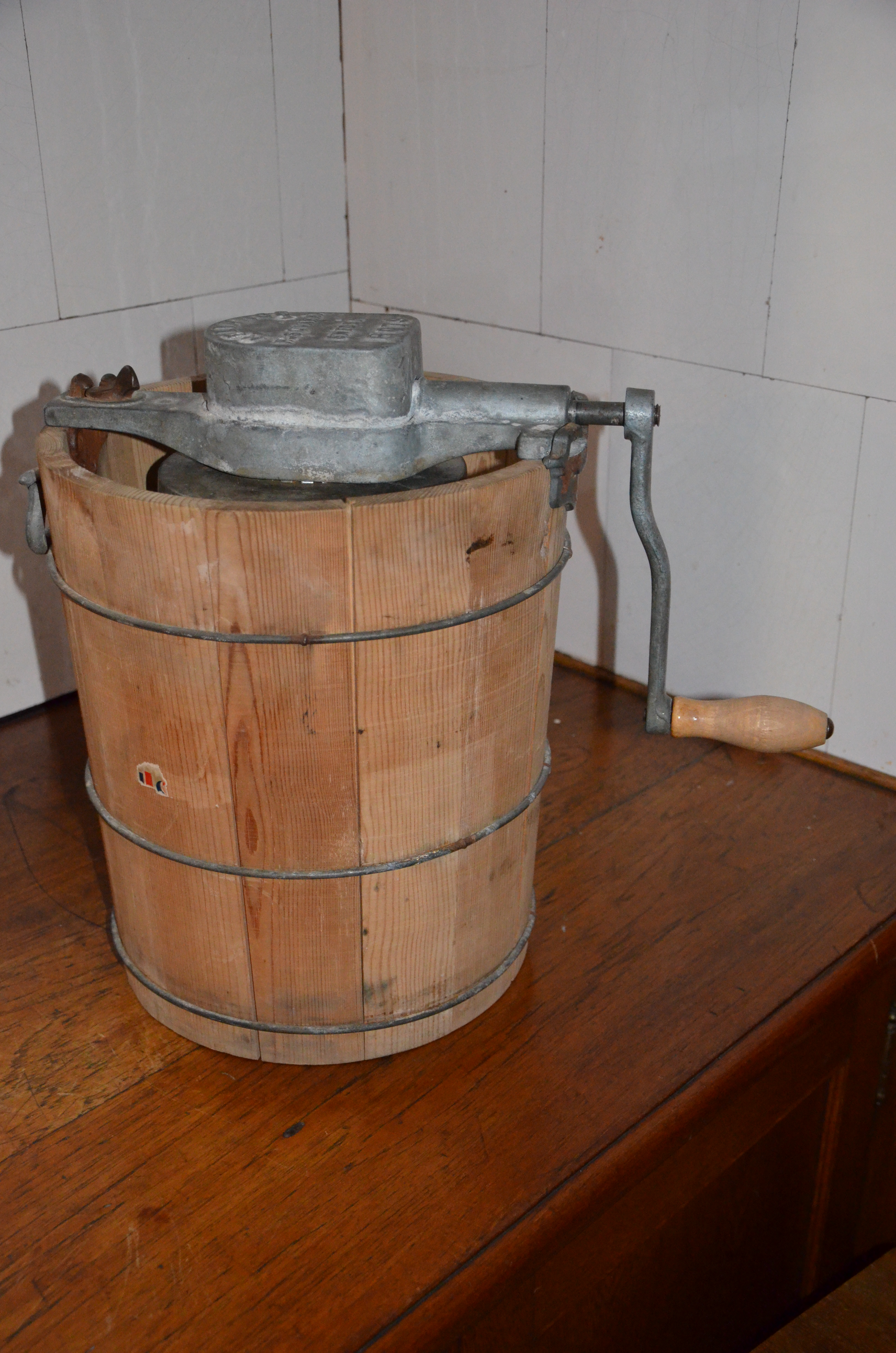
Hand-cranked ice cream maker

Nancy Johnson patented the first hand-cranked model in 1843. William Young produced the machine as the "Johnson Patent Ice-Cream Freezer" in 1848.

Hand-cranked machines' ice and salt mixture must be replenished to make a batch of ice cream. Usually, rock salt is used. The salt causes the ice to melt and lowers the temperature in the process, due to freezing point depression. The temperature at which salt water freezes is lower than the temperature at which fresh water freezes. The saltwater does not freeze amid below-zero temperatures due to the salt content. The sub-freezing temperature helps slowly freeze the edible mixture, making the ice cream.

Some small manual units comprise a bowl with coolant-filled hollow walls. These have a volume of approximately one pint (500 ml). The paddle is often built into a plastic top. The mixture is poured into the frozen bowl and placed in a freezer. The paddles are hand-turned every ten minutes or so for a few hours until reaching the desired consistency and flavor.

=== Electric machines ===
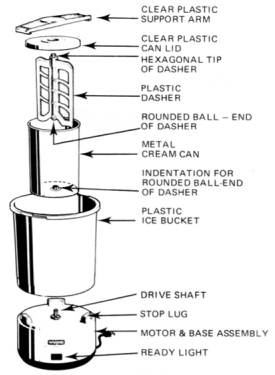
A diagram of an electric ice cream maker

There are four types of electric ice cream machines. Each has an electric motor that drives the bowl or the paddle to stir the mixture. The major difference between the four is how the cooling is performed.

==== Counter-top machines ====
Counter-top machines use a double-walled bowl with a solution between the walls (typically distilled water and urea) that freezes below 32 °F (0 °C). In a domestic freezer, this requires up to 24 hours before the machine is ready. Once frozen, the bowl is put into the machine, the mixture is added to the bowl, and the machine started. The paddles rotate, stirring the mixture as it gradually freezes through contact with the frozen bowl. After twenty to thirty minutes, the solution between the double walls thaws, and the ice cream freezes. This type of machine has the advantage of being relatively inexpensive; however, a pre-frozen bowl makes only one batch at a time. The bowl must be refrozen to make another batch. Multi-batches require extra bowls for the machine, which require extra freezer space.

==== Small freezer-unit machines ====
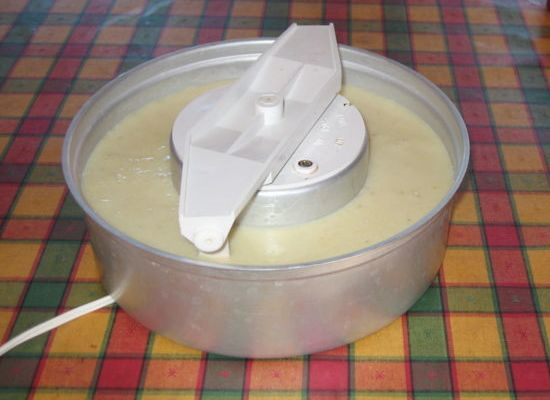
An ice cream maker that has to be placed inside the freezer.

Small freezer-unit machines sit inside the freezer (or the freezer part of the refrigerator) and operate similar to a food processor in slow-motion. Every few seconds, the paddles stir the mixture to prevent formation of large ice crystals. When the ice cream sufficiently freezes, the paddles automatically stop rotating and lift. Since the mixture is cooled in the freezer, it takes longer to freeze than other ice cream makers, which work by placing the ice cream bowl in direct contact with the cooling element. A disadvantage is that the freezer door has to be closed over the flat cord, which is plugged into the nearest power outlet. However, some modern refrigerators have a built-in ice-cream maker as an accessory or a specialized electrical outlet for freezer-unit machines. It is not necessary to pre-freeze this type of ice cream maker. However, some people feel that this type of machine produces a lower-quality ice cream because of its slow-motion method. Also available are cordless, battery-operated ice-cream makers that may be placed directly in the freezer, although these tend to require expensive non-rechargeable potassium batteries as both rechargeable batteries and regular alkaline cells tend to perform poorly at low temperatures.

==== Built-in freezer machines ====
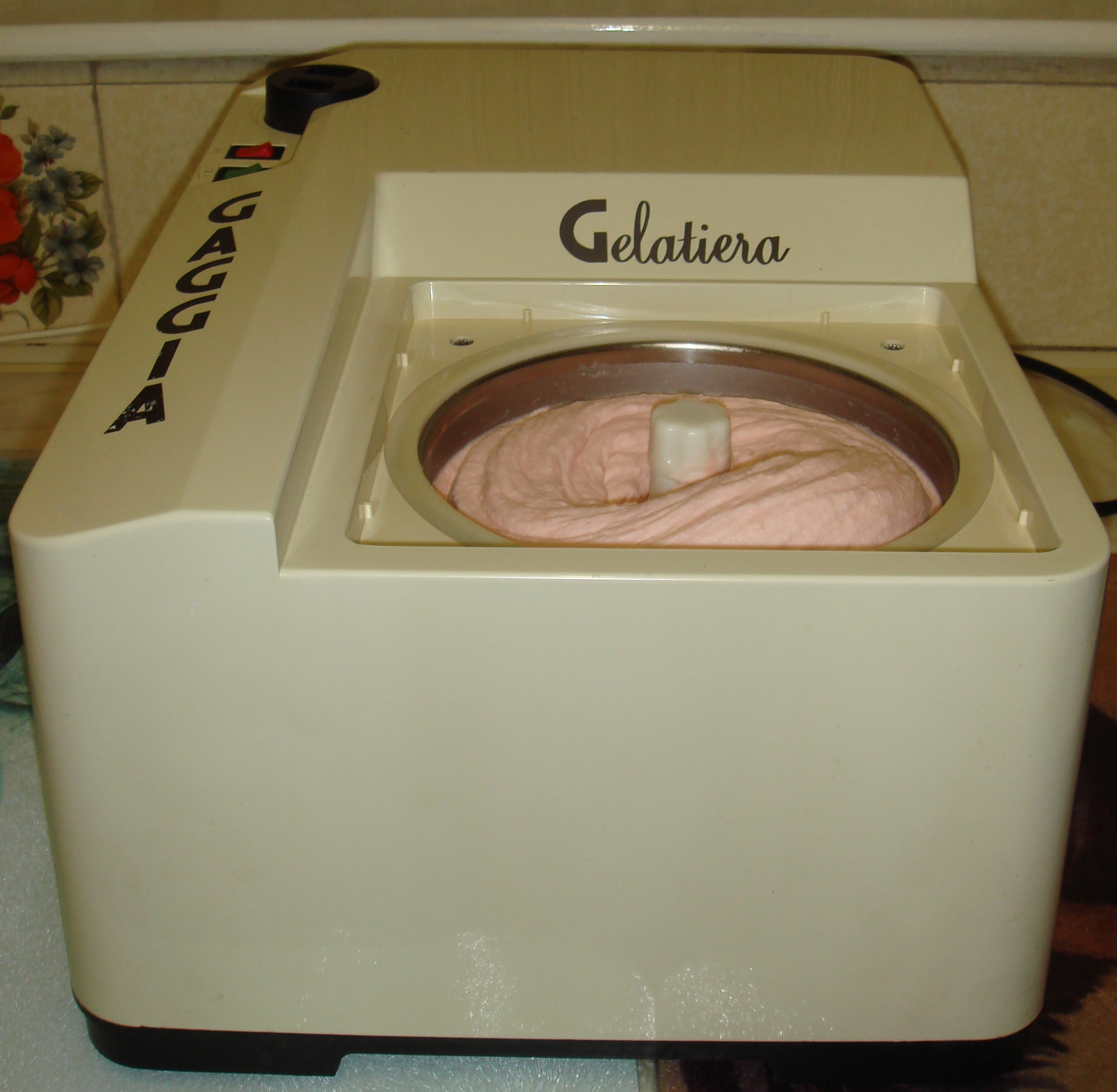
A table top Gelato machine or Italian ice cream maker with its own built-in freezing system.

More expensive, and usually larger, machines have a freezing mechanism built in and do not require a bowl to be pre-chilled. A few minutes after starting the cooling system, the mixture can be poured in and the paddle started. As with coolant-bowl machines, ice cream is ready in twenty to thirty minutes depending on the quantity and recipe. These machines can be used immediately with no preparation, and they make any number of batches of ice cream without a delay between batches. Some of these machines cannot be moved without waiting twelve hours before use since moving the unit upsets coolant in the freezing system. These machines are normally kept permanently in one position ready for use making them impractical in smaller kitchens.

==== Ice-salt coolant machines ====
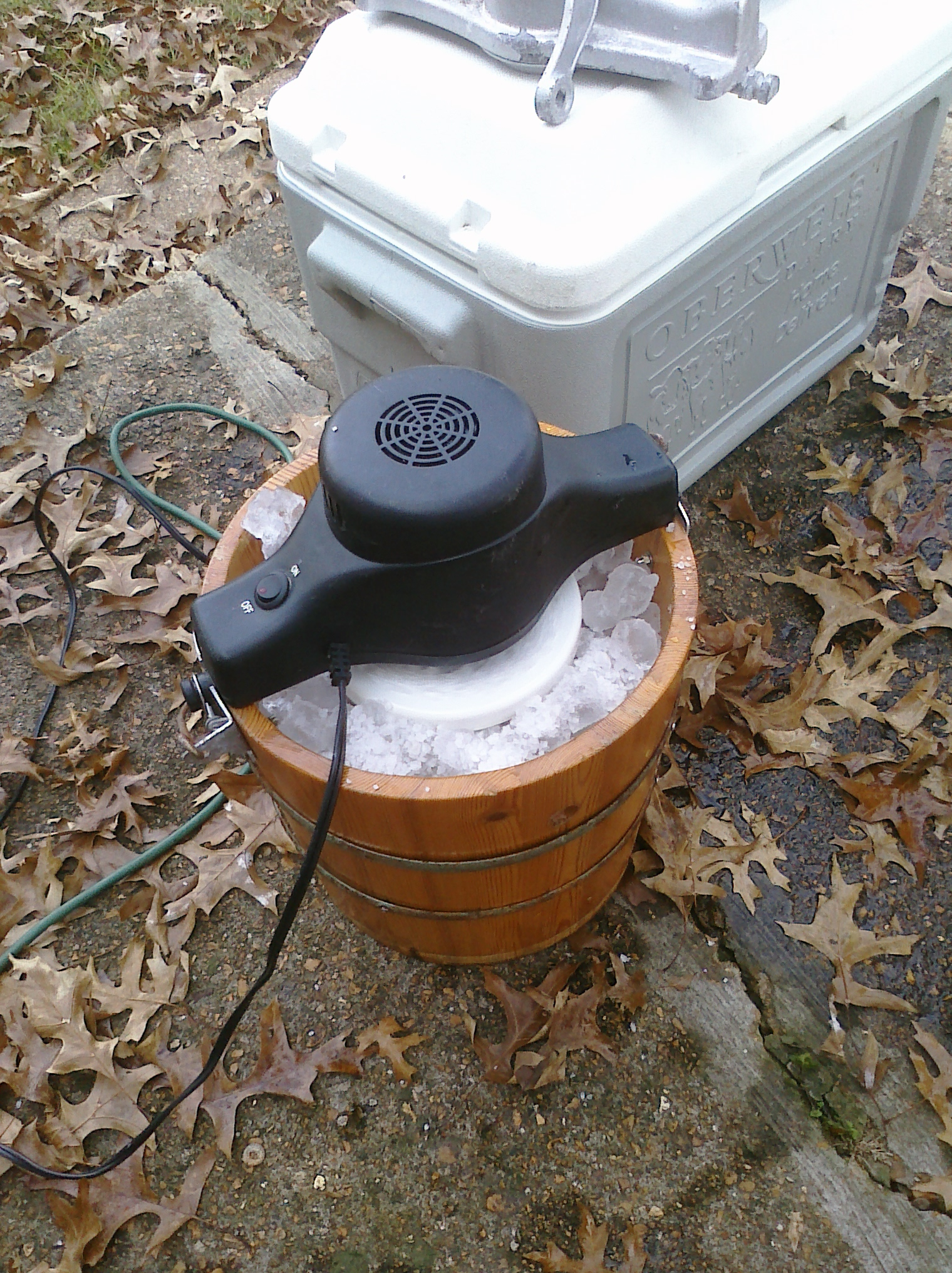
Electrically operated ice cream maker

The fourth type of electric ice cream maker uses an outer tub filled with ice and salt for chilling using freezing point depression. An inner canister holds the ice cream mixture and churn and scraper assembly. A high-speed electric motor, geared at approximately 75 rpm, drives a mechanism that simultaneously rotates the canister, counter-rotates the scraper, and holds the churn paddles stationary. As the canister turns, the ice cream mixture freezes against the inner wall of the canister. The counter-rotating scraper constantly removes the frozen product from the canister wall and returns it to the mixture. The continuing turning motion of the canister against the stationary churn paddles causes the mixture to become increasingly thick. Enough time, ice and salt produces a smooth "hard packed" ice cream.
