= Huma Qureshi (disambiguation) =

Huma Qureshi (born 1986) is an Indian actress.

Huma Qureshi may also refer to:

- Huma Qureshi (journalist), freelance journalist
- Huma Qureshi, former director of the Pakistan Health Research Council
