= Florence A. George =

English schoolteacher and cookbook writer (1864–1918)

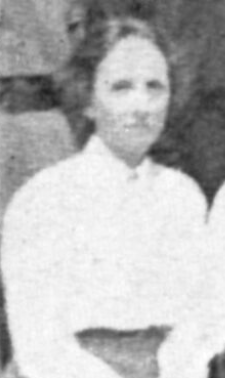
- George in 1913
- Born: Florence Annie George; 1864; Gloucester, England
- Died: 3 July 1918 (aged 55); Amberley, Gloucestershire, England
- Education: The National Training School of Cookery (first-class diploma)
- Occupations: Schoolteacher; cookbook writer
- Employer: King Edward VI High School for Girls
- Notable work: King Edward's Cookery Book (1901); Vegetarian Cookery (1908)

Florence Annie George (1864 – 3 July 1918) was an English schoolteacher and cookbook writer. Trained at the National Training School of Cookery, she was appointed cookery mistress at King Edward VI High School for Girls in Birmingham in 1894. Her books included King Edward's Cookery Book (1901), Vegetarian Cookery (1908), Economical Dishes for Wartime (1916), and the posthumously published A Manual of Cookery (1920).

George treated cookery as a practical subject in girls' education. Vegetarian Cookery included meat-free and reduced-meat dishes, while Economical Dishes for Wartime adapted recipes for food shortages during the First World War. Later writers have discussed her vegetarian recipes, including her recipes for nut cutlets, in accounts of vegetarian cookery.

== Biography ==
=== Early life and education ===
Florence Annie George was born in Gloucester in the second quarter of 1864. Her parents were William D. George, a canal superintendent, and Annie George. She had two sisters and two brothers. George later earned a first-class diploma from The National Training School of Cookery, London.

=== Teaching career ===
In 1894, George was appointed cookery mistress at King Edward VI High School for Girls, Birmingham. The appointment was made by the headmistress, Edith Creak, despite objections from the school governors to the inclusion of cookery in the curriculum.

=== Writing ===
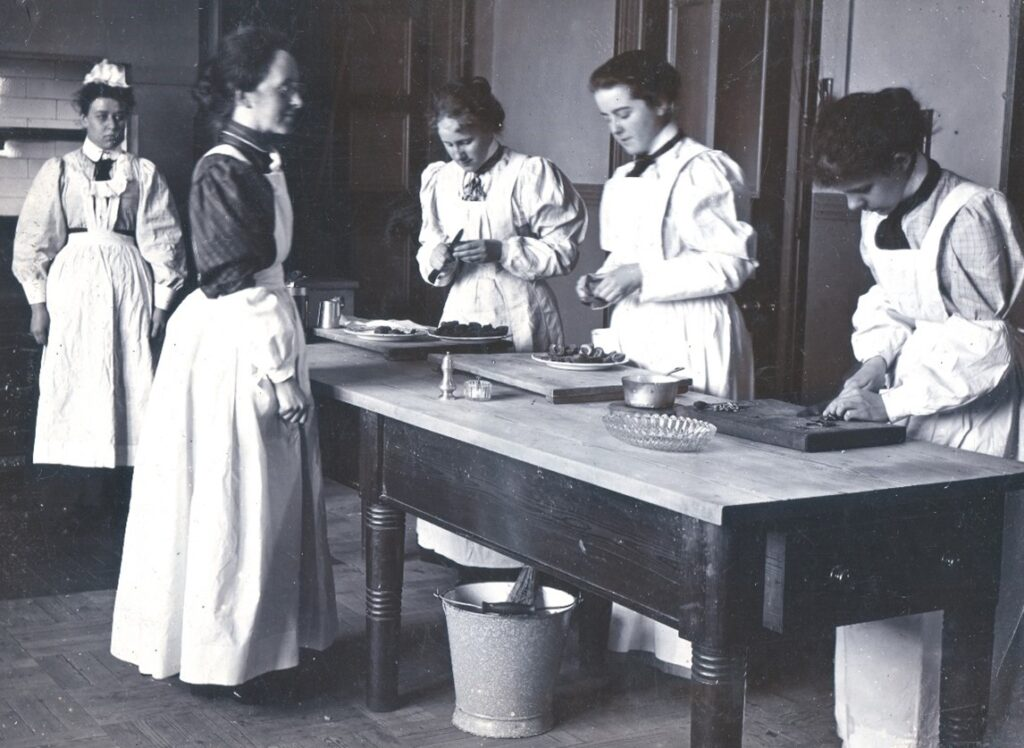
George (second from the left) teaching at King Edward VI High School for Girls, c. 1900

==== King Edward's Cookery Book ====
George regarded cooking as a scientific skill that should be taught to girls. In 1901, she published King Edward's Cookery Book as a textbook for general use. The Publishers' Circular described it as a concise and methodical cookery guide for middle-class Englishwomen, covering practical matters such as scullery work, kitchen equipment, and seasonal ingredients. By 1921, it had sold 20,000 copies.

==== Vegetarian Cookery ====
In 1908, George published Vegetarian Cookery. Its preface stated that the book was "written for those who, from principle, wish to abstain from meat, as well as for the many who, from reasons of health, are obliged to reduce the proportion of it in their daily diet." The book included recipes using ingredients such as onions, parsley, salt, and pepper to make vegetarian dishes intended to resemble the flavours and textures of meat-based meals, including a chicken substitute made from butter bean paste. The book's two recipes for nut cutlets have been described as ancestors of the nut roast. Vegetarian Cookery went through at least six imprints.

==== Economical Dishes for Wartime ====
During the First World War, George published Economical Dishes for Wartime (1916). The book contained her earlier recipes adapted for wartime shortages.

=== Death ===
George died following an illness in Amberley, Gloucestershire, on 3 July 1918, aged 54. At the time of her death, she had been working for several years on a larger cookbook. The work was completed by her former pupil Kate Lackland and edited by Irene Davison. It was published as A Manual of Cookery in 1920.

== Legacy ==
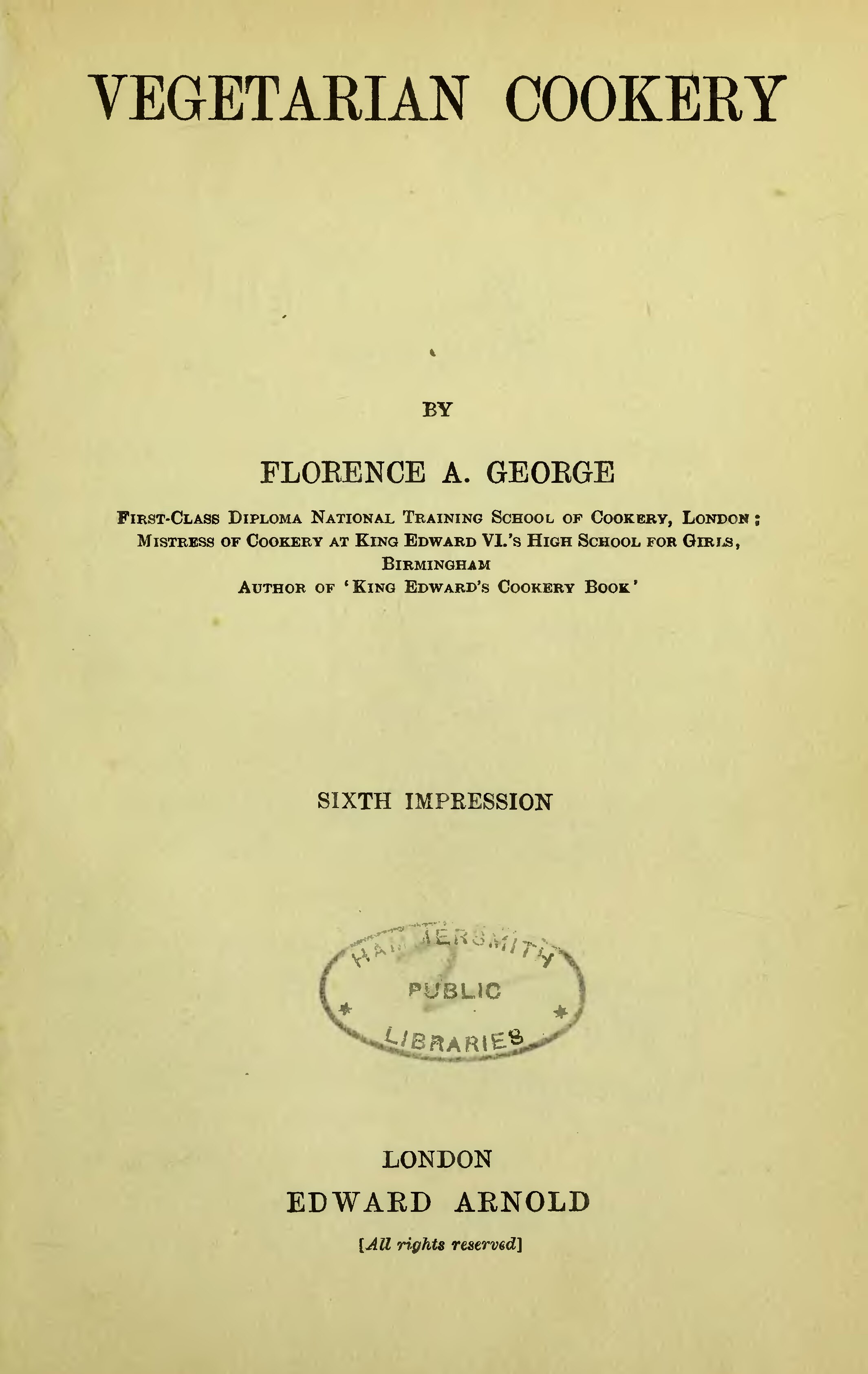
Title page of Vegetarian Cookery

In 2011, Sally Huxley, who succeeded George as head of food studies at George's former school, published Recipes for Success, a contemporary book on domestic science. The book discusses George's role in the teaching of the subject and includes recipes intended to reflect later social trends.

George and Vegetarian Cookery were briefly discussed in Colin Spencer's The Heretic's Feast: A History of Vegetarianism. Anne O'Connell, who later attended George's school, wrote that Spencer's discussion of George led her to write Early Vegetarian Recipes, a book on the history of vegetarian recipes.

One recipe from King Edward's Cookery Book was included in Annie Gray's The Official Downton Abbey Cookbook.

== Publications ==
- King Edward's Cookery Book (London: Edward Arnold, 1901)
- Vegetarian Cookery (London: Edward Arnold, 1908)
- Economical Dishes for Wartime (Birmingham: Cornish Brothers, 1916)
- A Manual of Cookery (London: Edward Arnold, 1920)

== See also ==
- History of vegetarianism
- Women and vegetarianism and veganism advocacy
- Women in the Victorian era
- Vegetarianism in the United Kingdom
- Vegetarianism in the Victorian era
