= The National Training School of Cookery =

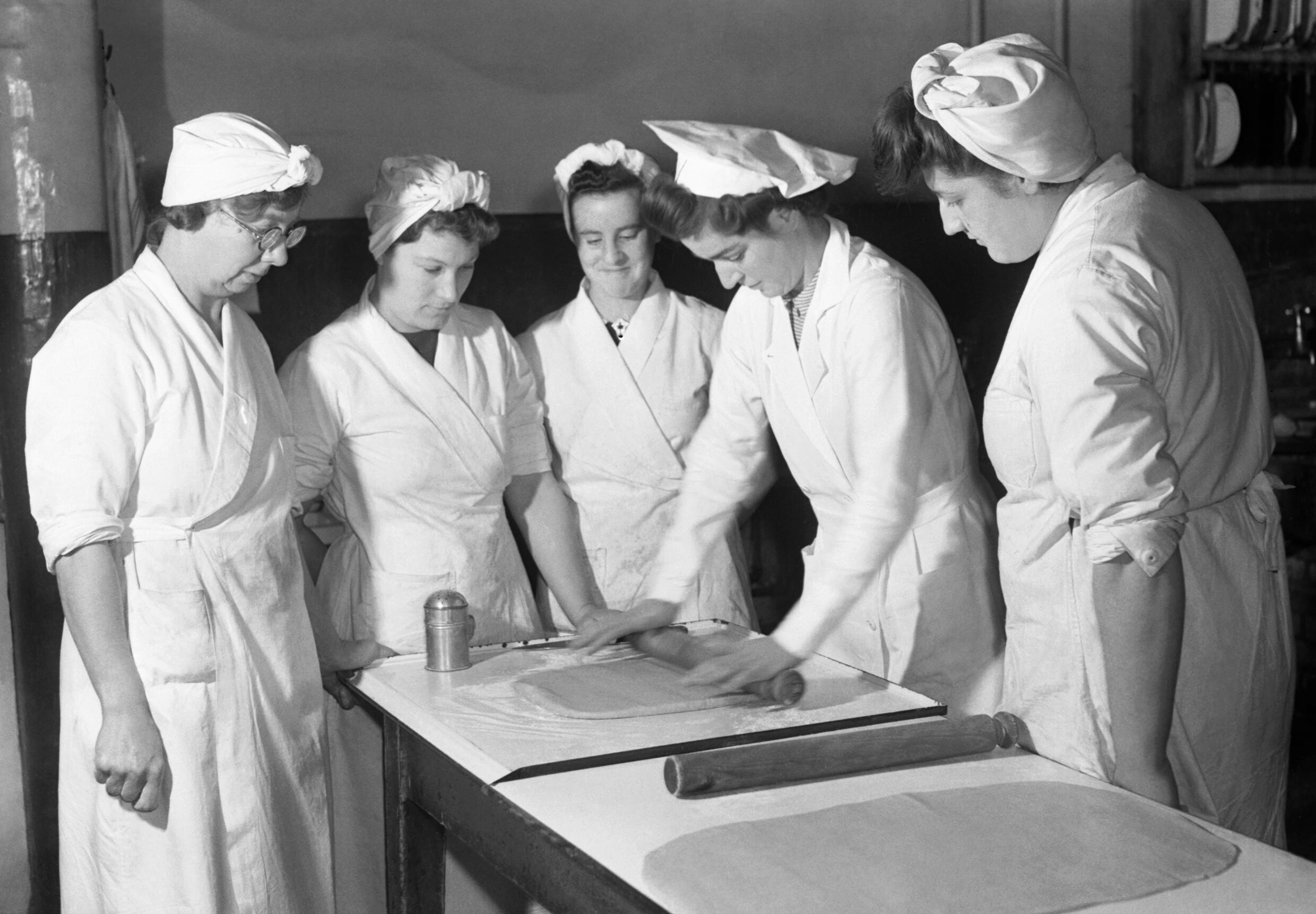
Pastry making demonstration at the National Training College of Domestic Science, 1944

The National Training School Of Cookery was a teaching organisation in London from 1873 to 1962. It changed its name to The National Training School of Cookery and Other Branches of Domestic Economy in 1902 and, in 1931 became The National Training College of Domestic Science.

== Origins ==
Following the success of the Great Exhibition of 1851 a series of small international exhibitions were held in South Kensington, organised by the Commissioners for that of 1851. The 1873 exhibition included cookery lectures and demonstrations in a specially equipped building- free to the public but charging for copies of the recipes demonstrated. The project was a big success and sale of recipes netted £1765. Largely because of the enthusiasm of one of the Commissioners, Sir Henry Cole, the Committee overseeing the lectures continued in being as the executive committee for the creation of a national cookery school. Money was raised, the school was granted permission to occupy the corrugated iron building used for the 1893 lectures, and it was loaned all the equipment used by the demonstrators. From the start, the ′National′ as it was loosely known, was conceived as a national institution, not just a London organisation- the 1873 prospectus envisaged the School to ′be in alliance with the School Boards and Training Schools throughout the Country′. ′In the mornings........Pupil Teachers and others engaged in public education will be instructed at fees as moderate as possible.′ ′In the afternoons... a Lecture and Demonstration will be given, at which the public will be admitted upon payment...′

The first Lady Superintendent of the National was Lady Barker who lasted little more than a year. She was succeeded in 1875 by one of the early pupils of the School, Miss Edith Nicholls, soon to be married and henceforth known as Mrs Charles Clarke. Her term of office lasted 45 years and she was succeeded by her daughter. Eventually the unsuitable corrugated iron buildings were abandoned and the school moved into purpose-built premises in Buckingham Palace Road in 1889. The school was renamed 'The National Training School of Cookery and Other Branches of Domestic Economy' in 1902 to reflect an expanded curriculum which by then included many domestic skills although cookery remained at the heart of the curriculum.

== 19th century ==
=== Objectives and operation ===
The objectives as set out in 1873 reflected these arrangements. The School was to train teachers to teach cookery in ′Training Schools, School Board Schools, Poor Schools and similar institutions′ and to send out teachers, with equipment, to give lessons nationwide if suitable payments were made. The school also was to teach fee-paying ′persons desirous of acquiring a knowledge of the principles of Cookery′. The cookery taught at the School was, broadly, either Plain Cookery, intended to instruct pupil teachers who would disseminate these recipes to working-class women and more particularly, to the next generation of them in schools, or High Class Cookery, intended to instruct both those intending to work in the households of the middle and upper-classes and the women in these classes who would be their employers. On occasion, celebrity chefs, such as Herman Senn, were invited to lecture. Plain cookery classes assumed no knowledge of cookery and the recipe cards with such classes went through every step in minute detail. Ingredients are set out at the start, costed to the nearest farthing. For instance, shepherd's pie was costed in 1875 at 9 1/4 old pence (4p). The objective of Plain Cookery teaching was, according to Mrs Clarke ′to insure for the working-man a wholesome meal nicely prepared, which will supply the nourishment he requires to enable him to do a hard day's work. The lassitude produced by bad food and hard work is a constant source of the craving for stimulants which drives the working-man to the public-house. This teaching will end to lessen this evil and improve the health of the people.′ One suspects that Mrs Clarke had little experience of the life led by ordinary Londoners at this time!

Mrs Clarke's book of high class recipes was a more lavish production than the former book, with much gold-blocking on spine and cover. The recipes are often complicated and the majority have French names. She explained that the recipes ′are intended for the use of both ladies and cook'.

The emergence of a national cookery and domestic science school at this time is explainable by the changes in society in the late nineteenth century. Industrialisation had produced a large urban working-class, many of whom had not been taught cookery by their mothers and some of whom had only rudimentary cooking facilities in their homes. The spread of elementary schools gave an opportunity to educate working-class girls in basic cookery. At the other end of the social scale, more and more middle-class households were taking on live-in servants. These were the lower-middle classes, able often to afford just one servant, often a young girl, who had to do all the household tasks as well as cook. The servant was often a novice cook and her mistress was a novice servant-employer, so both could benefit from lessons at the School. The range of the School's activities, and the different social classes catered for, is reflected in its revised list of fees of 1921. Most expensive was the Cordon Bleu course at £60. Other courses included: Household Management; Housekeeping; Ladies’ Short Cookery Course; Plain Cookery; Superior Household Cookery; Cook's Certificates In Plain And High Class Cookery; lessons in needlework, dressmaking, laundry, millinery, tailoring, and 'Odd Jobs Demonstrations'.

Throughout its existence this was essentially a women's college- women ran the institution day-to-day, led by a Lady Superintendent. They formed the teaching staff (all were women, in neat uniforms, in a group photograph of 1912). And almost all the students were women, either trainee teachers, school girls, domestic servants, or middle- and upper-class women. The many photographs included in Dorothy Stone's history of the School rarely include men. A group photograph of all staff and pupils in 1945 depicts a group of over 150 women and no men. In contrast, the Executive Committee, responsible for major decisions on the future of the institution and its financial health, was long dominated by men. The original Committee formed in 1873 was chaired by The Hon. F. Leveson-Gower, M.P. Eight other members included a Viscount and two military officers. Not until 1905 was a woman appointed to the Executive Committee – she became ‘Chairman’ in 1915. In 1930 there were five women members in a committee of 15. Some of the early staff members were authors of cookery books as well as teachers and administrators. The first Lady Superintendent, Lady Barker, wrote First Lessons In The Principles Of Cookery, (1874), and the long serving holder of that post, Mrs Charles Clarke, wrote many books, including many of the various editions of the school Handbook. The woman credited by Charles Dickens, Jr. with devising the first curriculum of the School, Miss Mary Hooper, wrote at least 7 cookery books as well as a number of novels. To support the war effort, a book Thrift For Troubled Times was ′Compiled by the Staff of The National School of Cookery during the great war′. The ′National′ had recurring financial problems, no patron had endowed it with a secure financial ‘cushion’ and every few years the problem of money resurfaced until it was finally forced to close in 1962. A letter to The Tablet in 1881 from the Chairman of the Executive Committee sets out what the ′National′ had achieved in the first 10 years of operation but the real purpose of the letter is an appeal for money.

SIR,—Will you allow me, as chairman of the Executive Committee of the National Training School of Cookery, to call the attention of the public to the work done by our institution and also its present position.

Since its establishment in 1874, 12,441 persons have received instruction in our school. It has trained and granted diplomas to 148 teachers. Our own staff have conducted 259 classes in 159 places throughout the country, including London and its suburbs. We have received from those classes the gross sum of £3,371, made up of fees varying from is. 6d. to 2d. a lesson.

The other schools of cookery throughout the country have employed many teachers trained in our school, and I may add that there is an increasing demand for them in the elementary schools. During the first six years our receipts balanced our expenditure, but during the last year they have failed to do so owing, partly to the effects of the severe winter and the general depression of trade, but mainly to the unavoidable reconstruction of our premises. Under these circumstances we confidently appeal to the public for donations to clear off our debt and for subscriptions to carry on the work with proper efficiency.

I have the honour to be, Sir, Your obedient servant,

F. LEVESON-GOWER.

P.S.—Subscriptions should be paid to the accountant of the school at the London and Westminster Bank, or to the secretary at the school.

In 1879 Dickens's Dictionary of London gives the following description of this institution:

The National School of Cookery, Exhibition-road, South Kensington, commenced its work in the year 1873 under the title of the Popular School of Cookery, and was located in the building of the International Exhibition of that year. At the close of the International Exhibition the commissioners granted to the executive committee of the National School of Cookery the temporary use, free of rent, of that portion of the building already occupied by it, together with some more space for an additional kitchen and offices. Up to the present time it has not been found possible for the school to provide its own premises, and therefore the use of the exhibition building is continued to it. Lectures and demonstrations are now given daily in this school by students going through a course of training as teachers. Cooks and others are instructed in all branches of cookery, and lessons can be had singly or in a course. The public are admitted to see the school at work every afternoon, except Saturday, between three and four o’clock. The Crystal Palace classes for cookery and domestic economy were commenced in the Ladies’ Division of the School of Art, Science, and Literature in the year 1875. On the removal of the school to its present position in the tropical department of the palace, Miss Mary Hooper was entrusted with the formation of a new series of classes for instruction in cookery and every branch of domestic economy. These classes have been continued to the present time The instruction is given by practical illustrations, and is designed for ladies, from a lady's point of view, and not for the training of servants. It includes all that is necessary to make home comfortable and attractive, and a lady accomplished ruler of her own house. At each cookery lesson, two or more dishes are prepared which are tasted by the students. At this school single lessons are not given, and the number of students received for each course is limited.

== 20th century ==
In 1931 the school became The National Training College of Domestic Science.

Inadequately funded, it closed in 1962. Some of its assets were transferred to the Department of Nutrition at Queen Elizabeth College.

== Notable alumni ==
Ann Fawcett Story who was trained here introduced the teaching of cookery and cookery teachers at the Fort Street Public School in Australia in 1889.

Florence A. George, who earned a first-class diploma, went on to become cookery mistress of King Edward VI High School for Girls and authored four cookbooks.
