= Agnes Smith =

Agnes Smith is the name of:

- Agnes Smith Lewis, Semitic scholar
- Agnes Marshall (1855–1905), née Smith, English culinary entrepreneur
- Agnes Coolbrith Smith, wife of Joseph Smith
