= Augustus Jackson =

American confectioner and chef (1808–1852)

- Born: April 16, 1808; Philadelphia, Pennsylvania, United States
- Died: January 11, 1852 (aged 43)
- Occupations: Businessperson, chef, ice cream maker, confectioner
- Known for: Inventing a modern method of manufacturing ice cream and for new flavor development

Augustus Jackson (April 16, 1808 – January 11, 1852) was a businessperson, chef, ice cream maker, and confectioner from Philadelphia, Pennsylvania. He is credited as inventing a modern method of manufacturing ice cream and for new flavor development. He is nicknamed “the Father of Ice Cream”, despite not inventing ice cream. Jackson served for twenty years as a chef at the White House in Washington, D.C., before opening his own catering and confection business.

== Early life and White House Chef ==
Augustus Jackson was born on April 16, 1808, in Philadelphia, Pennsylvania.

Jackson worked as a chef in the White House in Washington, D.C. from 1817 until 1837. He cooked for United States Presidents James Madison, James Monroe, John Quincy Adams, and Andrew Jackson.

== Career ==
After leaving the White House, Jackson moved to Philadelphia and created his own successful catering business. He developed ice cream flavors which he packaged in tin cans and distributed to other ice cream parlors in Philadelphia. Jackson eventually became one of the city's wealthiest residents at the time.

Now known as the "father of ice cream," Jackson is said to have pioneered some of its modern manufacturing methods in the United States, namely the practice of adding salt to the ice, although mentions of salt and ice being used is mentioned as early as 1711 by English cookbook author Mary Eales in her book Mrs Mary Eales's Receipts. Additionally, Jackson developed techniques to control the custard while it was freezing. There is no evidence that Jackson patented any of his recipes or techniques. His ice cream flavors, techniques, and recipes are no longer documented. By 1928, an article in Capper's Weekly attributed to Jackson the title of the first to make modern ice cream.

Jackson died at the age of 43, on January 11, 1852.

== See also ==
- List of ice cream flavors
- Bastani, Booza, and Dondurma, types of early Middle Eastern ice cream
