= Karthi Gnanasegaram =

British television and radio presenter

Karthi Gnanasegaram is a British television and radio presenter working for the BBC, Sky Sports, Classic FM, Amazon Prime Video, the Royal Opera House, and Premier League Productions.

She has been a regular presenter on the BBC for sports programmes like the Wimbledon Championships and on BBC One's BBC News at Ten, BBC Breakfast, BBC Radio 5 Live, The Chris Evans Breakfast Show and Today. Since 2017 she has been a presenter for Classic FM. She is also a reporter for the Sky Sports Tennis channel and a presenter for Amazon Prime Video's tennis and football coverage and Premier League Productions.

== Education ==
She studied at King Edward VI High School for Girls, a public school in Edgbaston, Birmingham, followed by a Classics degree at Emmanuel College, University of Cambridge. Whilst at Cambridge she wrote for the student paper, Varsity, and played hockey, tennis and badminton (gaining blues in the latter two sports). She played both the violin and piano to Grade 8, and toured Europe playing the violin.

== Career ==
Karthi Gnanasegaram began her career as a sports reporter and presenter, working for outlets including BBC London News, Liquid News, Sportsworld, StreetFood at Al Jazeera English, and Sky News.

Gnanasegaram returned to the BBC and was part of the presenting lineup at the 2012 Summer Olympics in London and presented a BBC1 highlights show during the 2014 Commonwealth Games in Glasgow. She hosts Wimbledon tennis coverage and serves as an on-court interviewer for BBC Radio 5 Live. She reports for BBC Sport across various programmes, including Match of the Day, Football Focus, Final Score, and The Wimbledon Championships. Gnanasegaram is also a regular presenter for the Today Sports Desks on BBC Radio 4.

Her BBC Radio appearances extend to BBC Radio 4's Woman's Hour and Sara Cox's The Radio 2 Breakfast Show.

Gnanasegaram was part of the BBC Sport team at the 2016 Summer Olympics in Rio and the 2020 Summer Olympics in Tokyo. She commentated at the Rio Olympic Park and covered the opening and closing ceremonies of the Tokyo 2020 Games for Olympic Broadcasting Services. She also contributed to the TNT Sports (United Kingdom) coverage of the 2024 Summer Olympics in Paris.

In 2017, Gnanasegaram read the Classified Football Results on Sports Report on BBC Radio, becoming the second female to do so after Charlotte Green.

Also in 2017, she began presenting for Classic FM during their 25th anniversary year. She presented the Classic FM Sporting Music Countdown Show with Henry Blofeld and she created and presented the series Perfect Pitch in 2019 and 2024, where she interviewed sports stars like Andy Murray, Shane Warne, and Ian Wright about their favourite classical music pieces.

Gnanasegaram is a presenter for IMG's coverage of the Premier League. Since its launch at the 2023 US Open, she has been a reporter for the Sky Sports Tennis Channel. Additionally, she has hosted sessions for the United Nations at Goals House and she appeared as herself in the film Fisherman's Friends: One and All.
