= Ann Fawcett Story =

Australian cookery instructor (1846–1911)

- Born: Ann Morris; 25 September 1846; Hastings
- Died: 11 February 1911 (aged 64); Sea Point
- Education: The National Training School of Cookery
- Employer: Fort Street Public School
- Known for: creating cookery teachers
- Spouse: William Fawcett Story
- Children: seven

Ann Fawcett Story born Ann Morris (25 September 1846 – 11 February 1911) was a British-born Australian cookery instructor at the Fort Street Public School. She introduced cookery as a subject in Australian schools in New South Wales and in Victoria.

== Life ==
Story was born in the Sussex parish of St Mary in the Castle in Hastings. Her parents were Jane (born Cramp) and William Morris. Her career was clear when she obtained a first class pass from the National Training School for Cookery in South Kensington. Her first job was with a London catering company.

In 1867 she married Wilson Fawcett Story in Stoke Newington and in time they had seven children. On 22 October they made up just over 400 immigrants who set off from Plymouth on board the Forfarshire. The ship arrived in Australia on 22 January 1882 at Sydney.

She went to work in 1883 employed by the Board of Technical Education and she ran well received lessons in cookery. In 1886 the funding ended and she found similar work at the Hurlstone Training College.

Story was employed to introduce cookery as a subject in 1889 in the Fort Street Public School in Sydney. Her work was well supported and she was promoted each year and in 1891 she was supervising the teaching and specifying the cookery curriculum. In the following year the school bought portable cookery facilities and on her advice began to train new teachers. She resigned in 1896 after a dispute. She had by that point been visiting twelve different locations. The teaching of cookery that she had created continued when it was managed by district inspectors.

Story was then recruited to establish Victoria's school cookery centres. She was very keen to ensure that women knew how to cook for themselves. She did not want to teach domestic servants. She lectured at the Victorian teachers' training college.

Story died in Sea Point in 1911.
