= Winifred Savage =

Australian home economics teacher (1888–1977)

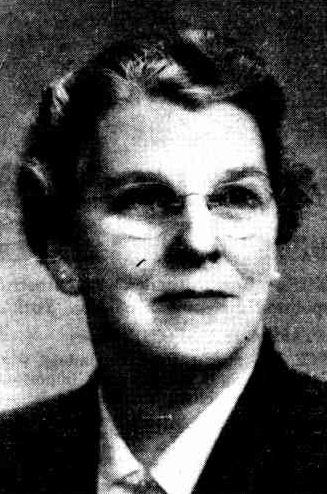
- 1953
- Born: Emily Winifred Nell; 2 August 1888; Enfield, Sydney
- Died: 16 February 1977 (aged 88); Mosman, Sydney
- Education: Fort Street Public School
- Occupations: teacher, lecturer and writer
- Employer: Sydney County Council
- Spouse: Henry Savage

(Emily) Winifred Savage born Emily Winifred Nell (2 August 1888 – 16 February 1977) was an Australian home economics teacher. She wrote influential books about cookery and became a lecturer and trainer of cookery and home economics. She gathered some celebrity by writing for the Countrywoman in New South Wales magazine and talking on the radio.

== Life ==
Savage was born in 1888 in the Sydney suburb of Enfield. Her parents, Emily (born Warcup) and Harry Nell, were both English immigrants. They had five children and their penultimate child was (Emily) Winifred. Her mother gave her informal cookery lessons which may have assisted in her being chosen to be among five women to train at Sydney's Fort Street Training School with Hannah Rankin in 1905. The school had a history of leading the teaching of cookery. Two years later she began her career teaching cookery as an assistant teacher at Sydney Girls' High School.

She was in Canada in 1925 when she saw her first pressure cooker. Cookery was being taught more in schools and her book A Handbook of Home Management was published in 1926 and was adopted as a school text book. In time it would go through ten editions with the tenth published in 1959.

In 1936 she returned to her career after a short marriage to 75 year old widower Henry Savage. She was employed by Sydney County Council and she lectured. She trained the council's demonstrators and she led their home management section from 1945 when she also began to regularly write for the Countrywoman in New South Wales. This was the journal of the New South Wales section of the Country Women's Association. She stayed with the council until 1953 and with the magazine until 1957.

In 1961 she published her book A Treasury of Good Recipes which were recipes she had previously published in the Sydney Morning Herald.

Savage died in 1977 in Mosman, Sydney.
