= Rachel Waterhouse =

English historian (1923–2020)

Dame Rachel Waterhouse
- Born: Rachel Elizabeth Franklin; 2 January 1923; Whitchurch, Somerset, England
- Died: 14 October 2020 (aged 97); Macclesfield, England
- Education: King Edward VI High School for Girls
- Alma mater: St Hugh's College, Oxford
- Occupation: Historian
- Years active: 1950s–2010
- Spouse: John Waterhouse
- Children: 4

Dame Rachel Elizabeth Waterhouse DBE (née Franklin; 2 January 1923 – 14 October 2020) was an English local historian, consumer affairs activist and writer.

== Biography ==
Rachel Franklin was born in Whitchurch, Somerset, the daughter of Percival Franklin, a loss adjuster, and his wife Ruby (née Knight). The family relocated to Birmingham while she was a child. Rachel won a scholarship to King Edward VI High School for Girls in the city, then an exhibition to study history at St Hugh's College, Oxford, graduating in 1944. After the Second World War she returned to Birmingham where she married John Waterhouse, a university lecturer, in 1947. In 1950 she completed a PhD at the University of Birmingham.

== Historian ==
Waterhouse became a founder member of The Victorian Society in 1958 and was instrumental in setting up the Birmingham Branch in 1967, serving as its first chairman between 1967 and 1971. She was a member of the group which resurrected the Lunar Society around 1990 and became its founder chairman. She was president of the Birmingham and Midland Institute for 1992.

== Consumers' Association ==
Waterhouse was a council member of the Consumers' Association from 1966 and its chairman from 1982 to 1990. She was also a member of the National Consumer Council and of the Health and Safety Commission.

== Honours ==
Waterhouse was made a Commander of the Most Excellent Order of the British Empire (CBE) in 1980 and a Dame Commander of the Most Excellent Order of the British Empire (DBE) in 1990. She received honorary degrees from Aston University, the University of Birmingham and Loughborough University.

== Death ==
Waterhouse died in 2020 at the age of 97. Her husband predeceased her in 2000. She was survived by her children (Matthew, Edmund, Deborah and Rebecca), eight grandchildren and three great-grandchildren.

== Written works ==
- The Birmingham and Midland Institute, 1854–1954
- Children in Hospital: a hundred years of child care in Birmingham
- A Hundred Years of Engineering Craftsmanship: a short history tracing the adventurous development of Tangye's Limited, Smethwick, 1857–1957
- King Edward VI High School for Girls, 1883–1983
- Six King Edward Schools, 1883–1983
- The 1990s and a Christian Response to Consumerism
- The Birmingham and Midland Institute: the Institute's contributions to Birmingham, 1855–2005

Joint authorship:

- How Birmingham became a Great City (jointly with John Whybrow)
- Birmingham One Hundred Years Ago: social and political life and cultural life (jointly with Charles Parish)
