= Vivien Knight =

British art historian and gallery director

- Born: Vivien Margaret Knight; 9 November 1953; Birmingham, England
- Died: 18 December 2009 (aged 56); St Joseph's Hospice, Hackney, London, England
- Education: King Edward VI High School for Girls, Leeds College of Art
- Occupations: art historian and gallerist
- Known for: head of the Guildhall Art Gallery
- Spouse: James Edward Bruce Faure Walker (m. 1981)
- Children: 3

Vivien Margaret Knight (9 November 1953 – 18 December 2009), was a British art historian and gallerist, and the head of the Guildhall Art Gallery, from 1983 until her death.

== Early life ==
Knight was born on 9 November 1953, at Solihull Hospital, Solihull, Birmingham, the elder child and only daughter of Donald Frank Knight, an art teacher and his wife, Valerie Knight, née Hanson, also a teacher.

She was educated at King Edward VI High School for Girls, Edgbaston, followed by a course in fine art and art history at Leeds College of Art.

== Career ==
In 1983, Knight was appointed as the head of the Corporation of London's art collection, later housed at the Guildhall Art Gallery.

The collection of some 4500 art works had mostly been in storage since 1941, and after having catalogued them, Knight worked to have them exhibited, firstly with The City's Pictures which she curated in 1987 at the Barbican Art Gallery. Finally in 1999, the new Guildhall Art Gallery, was opened, by The Queen.

Knight was often associated with shows and writings about mid to late-Victorian British artists, particularly as their works were present in some number in the Guildhall Art Gallery's collection.

According to her obituary in The Times, "it is hard to imagine how the Guildhall’s new art gallery would have been realised without her advocacy and her enormous vitality."

== Personal life ==
On 25 April 1981, only three weeks after first meeting, Knight married James Edward Bruce Faure Walker (born 1948), a painter and the founding editor of Artscribe, and they had three children.

== Later life ==
She died on 18 December 2009, at St Joseph's Hospice, Hackney, of pancreatic cancer, and was survived by her husband, James, and their three children.
