= Edith Clarke (cookery teacher) =

English cookery teacher

- Born: Edith Nicolls; 27 October 1844; Shooters Hill, Kent, United Kingdom
- Died: 20 August 1926 (aged 81); Earls Court, London, United Kingdom
- Spouse: Charles Clarke (1876–)
- Children: 3

Clarke's popular recipe book Plain Cookery Recipes.

Edith Clarke (née Nicolls MBE, 27 October 1844 – 20 August 1926) was a British cookery teacher and writer.

== Biography ==
She was born Edith Nicolls on 27 October 1844 at Shooters Hill, Kent, the only child of Lieutenant Edward Nicolls and his wife, Mary Ellen, née Peacock. Her father had died in March that year while attempting to save a man's life at sea. In August 1849, her mother married again, to novelist George Meredith, and her half-brother Arthur was born in 1853. From 1857 until her death in 1861, Mary left the marriage, leaving Edith to live with her maternal grandmother Lady Eleanor Nicolls.

On 22 August 1876 Edith married civil servant Charles Clarke, and they had three daughters.

In 1875 she was appointed second principal of the National Training School of Cookery in London, which had been established two years prior by family friend Henry Cole. She led the school for 44 years, giving practical demonstrations in cookery and producing cookery books. Her Plain Cookery Recipes (1883) went through 16 editions in 18 years.

She also campaigned to expand cookery teaching to poorer girls. By 1878, she had convinced the London school board to employ specialist cookery teachers in girls’ elementary schools, and she was an active member of the Association of Teachers of Domestic Subjects. She was appointed MBE in 1918 for her services to the advancement of domestic science.

She died on 20 August 1926 in her home in Earls Court, London.

== Works ==
Under her maiden name, she contributed a biographical note to Henry Cole's 1895 edition of the works of her maternal grandfather, Thomas Love Peacock.

Her publications for the National Training School of Cookery included Plain Cookery Recipes (1883), High-Class Cookery Recipes (1885), and Rules for the Management of Children's Classes by Demonstration and Practice (1896).
