= Mary Eales =

English writer

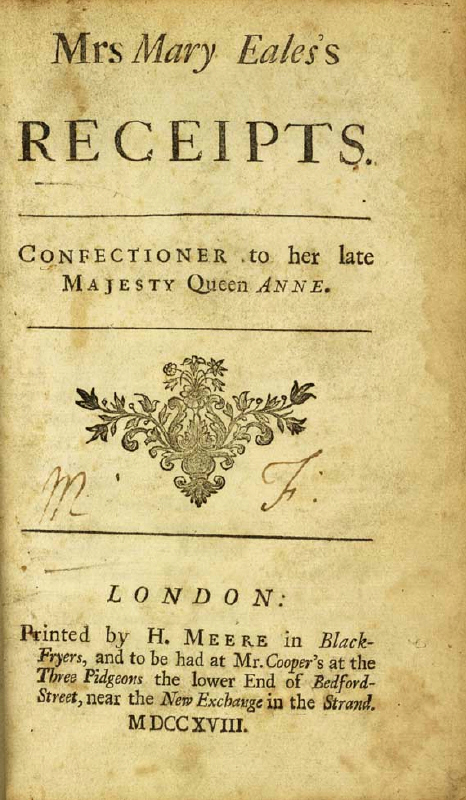
Title page of Mrs Mary Eales's Receipts (1718 edition)

Mary Eales (died c. 1718) was a writer of the cookery and confectionery book Mrs Mary Eales's Receipts, published in 1718. The little that is known about her life is from the title pages of the various editions of her book.

It is possible she died in 1718, but it is certain she was dead by 1733, when editions of her book referred to her as "the late ingenious Mrs Eales". Although her book stated she was the confectioner to King William and Queen Anne, there is no record of her in the accounts of the royal household.

== Life ==
Little is known about Eales's life. Her biographer, the historian Sara Pennell, observes that all the information about her is from her publications. Her date of birth and parentage are unknown, and it is not known whether the surname Eales is her birth name, or one acquired through marriage.

It is known that Eales published her book, Mrs Mary Eales's Receipts as early as 1711, as a manuscript with that date is "a copy from Mrs Eales book"; the manuscript was owned by Elizabeth Sloane, the daughter of Sir Hans Sloane. (Note: The common name for a recipe was, at the time, "receipt".) Manuscript copies were also in circulation in 1713, at a cost of five guineas. (Note: Early publication was a manual process of handwritten texts copied from an original; the distribution is known as scribal publication and was an economic method of producing a small number of copies, without the expense of printing.)

The first printed edition appeared in 1718, comprising 100 pages; there was no preface. The title page stated that Eales was the "Confectioner to her late majesty Queen Anne". According to Pennell, an examination of the records of the Lord Steward for Queen Anne's household show no-one under the name Mary Eales employed. (Note: Pennell notes that the first confectioner, employed in 1702, was a woman by the name Elizabeth Stephens.) The historian Gilly Lehman suggests that although not an employee of the household, Eales may have been an outside supplier who provided confections to the court which the royal kitchen did not or could not provide. By the 1733 edition, the description had been amended to "confectioner to their late majesties King William and Queen Anne".

The word "jam" made an early appearance in Mrs Mary Eales's Receipts, although her recipe differed from the norms of the time, by not being a solid food to eat in slices, but a semi-runny food, stored in jars and sealed with a paper lid. The book also contains the first recorded recipe in English for ice cream. Although there are records concerning ice cream being available in Britain as early as 1671, Eales was the first to record it in print. The historian Kate Colquhoun describes the first recipe as "confident, practical and detailed, if slightly roundabout". The recipe is a simple one, according to the food historian Laura Mason, and consisted of cream sweetened and with a fruit-flavouring added. The cookery writer Elizabeth David considers that Eales's recipe was derived from a French source. The recipe, titled "To Ice Cream", reads:

Take Tin Ice-Pots, fill 'em with any Sort of Cream you like, either plain or sweeten'd, or Fruit in it; shut your Pots very close; to six Pots you must allow eighteen or twenty Pound of Ice, breaking the Ice very small; there will be some great Pieces, which lay at the Bottom and Top.

You must have a Pail, and lay some Straw at the Bottom; then lay in your Ice, and put in amongst it a Pound of Bay-Salt; set in your Pots of Cream, and lay Ice and Salt between every Pot, that they may not touch; but the Ice must lie round them on every Side; lay a good deal of Ice on the Top, cover the Pail with Straw, set it in a Cellar where no Sun or Light comes, it will be froze in four Hours, but it may stand longer; than take it out just as you use it; hold it in your Hand and it will slip out.

When you wou'd freeze any Sort of Fruit, either Cherries, Rasberries, [sic] Currants, or Strawberries, fill your Tin-Pots with the Fruit, but as hollow as you can; put to 'em Lemmonade, [sic] made with Spring-Water and Lemmon-Juice sweeten'd; put enough in the Pots to make the Fruit hang together, and put 'em in Ice as you do Cream.

By the time of the 1733 edition of her book was published—retitled as The Compleat Confectioner—the frontispiece referred to "the late ingenious Mrs Eales", and stated that the issue had been "published with the consent of her executors". It is not clear when she died, but Pennell suggests it may have been the Mary Eales recorded as being buried in St Paul's, Covent Garden, on 11 January 1718; if it is the same person, then Eales was married with a daughter, Elizabeth, to whom she left her estate.

== Notes and references ==
=== Sources ===
- Colquhoun, Kate (2007). Taste: the Story of Britain Through its Cooking. New York: Bloomsbury. ISBN 978-1-5969-1410-0.
- David, Elizabeth (2014). An Omelette and a Glass of Wine. London: Penguin. ISBN 978-0-1404-6846-5.
- Davidson, Alan (1991). Fruit. London: Simon & Schuster. ISBN 978-0-6717-2884-7.
- Eales, Mary (1718). Mrs Mary Eales's Receipts. London: H Meere. OCLC 249044244.
- Eales, Mary (1733). The Compleat Confectioner. London: J Brindley. OCLC 559112716.
- Lehman, Gilly (2003). The British Housewife: Cooking and Society in 18th-century Britain (Kindle ed.). Totness, Devon: Prospect Books. ISBN 978-1-909248-00-7.
- Mason, Laura (2004). Food Culture in Great Britain. Westport, CT: Greenwood Press. ISBN 978-0-3133-2798-8.
- Oxford, Arnold Whitaker (1913). English Cookery Books to the Year 1850. Oxford University Press. OCLC 252887531.
- Pennell, S. M. (2011). "Eales, Mary (d. 1717/18?)". Oxford Dictionary of National Biography (online ed.). Oxford University Press. doi:10.1093/ref:odnb/65132. (Subscription, Wikipedia Library access or UK public library membership required.)
- "receipt and recipe". British Library. Archived from the original on 19 February 2020.
- Theophano, Janet (2002). Eat My Words: Reading Women's Lives Through the Cookbooks They Wrote. New York: Palgrave. ISBN 978-0-312-23378-5.
