= Huma Qureshi (journalist) =

- Education: Sciences Po Paris, King's College London, University of Warwick
- Known for: Literary Fiction Novels Short stories Memoir
- Website: https://www.humaqureshi.co.uk/

Huma Qureshi is a British author and former The Guardian and The Observer journalist.

== Career ==
Qureshi's coming-of-age memoir How We Met: A Memoir Of Love and Other Misadventures was published to favourable reviews in 2021, by Elliott & Thompson.

Qureshi's short story collection Things We Do Not Tell The People We Love was also published to critical acclaim in 2021, by Sceptre after a four-way auction. It was chosen as The Guardian's Book of The Day, described by The Sunday Times as "An impressive debut" and the i newspaper as "a luscious debut".

Qureshi's first book, In Spite of Oceans, received The John C Laurence Award. In 2020, Huma won the Harper's Bazaar Short Story Prize.

== Early life and education ==
Qureshi was born in the UK to Pakistani parents and brought up in the West Midlands. She attended King Edward VI High School For Girls, Edgbaston, Birmingham and graduated with a BA in English Literature and French from the University of Warwick, followed by an MA from Sciences Po Paris, the Paris Institute of Political Studies and King's College London. She got her first break at The Observer, where she was offered a job as a reporter after having worked as an intern for three months. She wrote for The Observer and The Guardian for several years before leaving to go freelance.

== Personal life ==
Qureshi is married with three sons. She wrote about her childhood, upbringing and marriage in her memoir, How We Met. She lives in London.

== Works ==
- Playing Games (2023, Sceptre)
- Things We Do Not Tell The People We Love (2021, Sceptre)
- How We Met: A Memoir Of Love and Other Misadventures (2021, Elliott & Thompson)
- In Spite of Oceans (2014, History Press)

== Awards and recognition ==
Literary Awards

- 2022 – The Edge Hill Prize (Things We Do Not Tell The People We Love - longlist)
- 2022 – The Jhalak Prize (Things We Do Not Tell The People We Love - longlist)
- 2022 – Books Are My Bag Non-Fiction Prize (How We Met - shortlist)
- 2020 – Harper's Bazaar Short Story Prize (winner)
- 2020 – SI Leeds Literary Prize (Things We Do Not Tell The People We Love - shortlist)
- 2020 – Bricklane Bookshop Short Story Award (shortlist)
- 2019 – Benedict Kiely Short Story Award (shortlist + second place)
- 2014 – The Authors' Foundation, John C Laurence Award (In Spite of Oceans)

Journalism Awards

- 2008 – Women of the Future Media Awards (Commended)
- 2008 – Finalist in the Prince of Wales Mosaic Talent awards (Arts, Culture and Media category)
- 2007 – Most Promising Newcomer at the BIBA press awards.
