= King Edward VI High School for Girls =

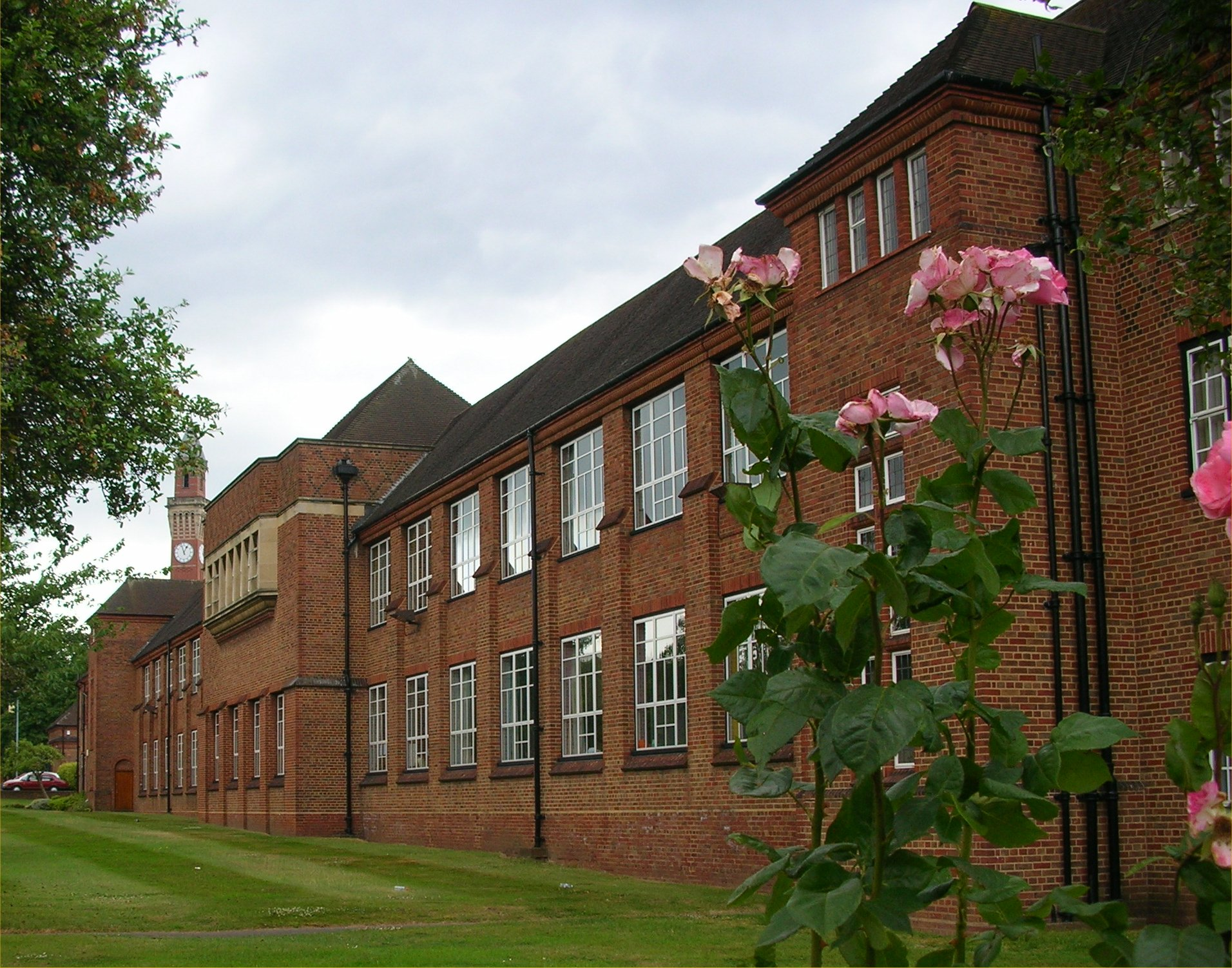

Location
- Edgbaston Park Road; Birmingham, West Midlands, B15 2UB; England; 52.4508°N 1.9254°W

Information
- Type: Public school (United Kingdom); Private day school
- Established: 1883
- Local authority: Birmingham
- Department for Education URN: 103585 Tables
- Principal: Kirsty von Malaisé
- Gender: Girls
- Age: 11 to 18
- Enrolment: 660
- Alumnae: Old Edwardians
- Website: www.kehs.org.uk

King Edward VI High School for Girls (KEHS) is an all-girls public school located in Edgbaston, Birmingham, England. It was founded in 1883 and occupies the same site as, and is twinned with the King Edward's School (KES; boys' school).

== History ==
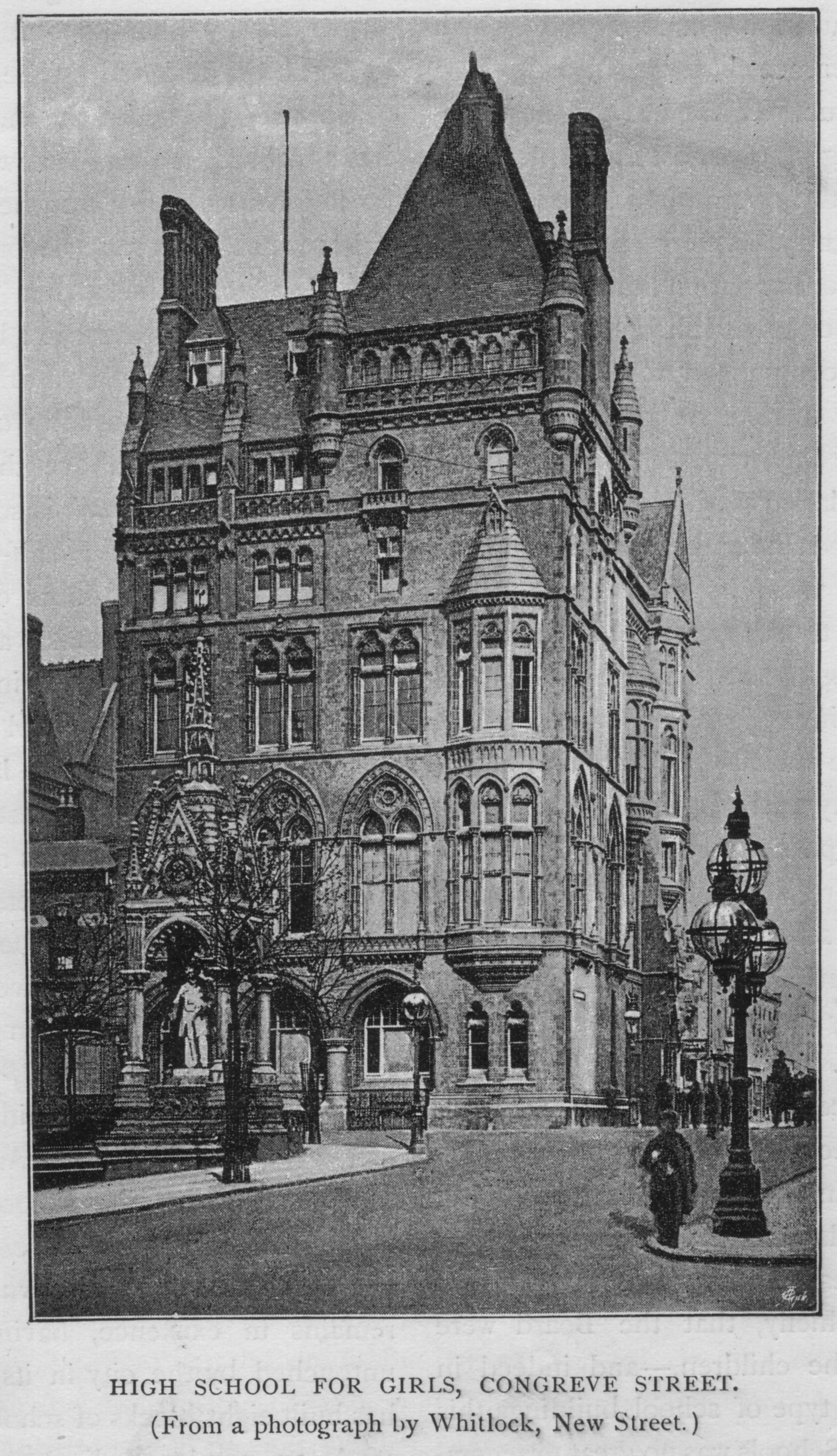
KEHS in 1888 at the former Liberal Club in central Birmingham

KEHS was founded in 1883 with Edith Creak, who was one of the first women admitted to a degree in London University, as the founding head. The school occupied part of the 1838 New Street boys' school (Charles Barry, architect). In 1887, when the adjacent Hen & Chickens Hotel was known to be closing the governors considered acquiring it. In 1888, KEHS moved to the recently vacated, and almost brand new (1885), Liberal Club on Congreve Street (a site previously covered by the lending section of the Birmingham Central Library) under a short lease. Meanwhile, plans for a new school on the Hen and Chickens site were being drawn up by the foundation's architect, J. A. Chatwin. In 1892, land behind the hotel was bought with the intention of building the girls' school off the main road. The New Street school opened in 1896. It moved, along with the boys' school, to its present location opposite the University in 1940 to new buildings designed by Holland W. Hobbiss. At this time a new, green uniform was introduced. The New Street site was bought by the Prudential Assurance Company and leased for the Odeon cinema.

Over one of the entrances is the motto Trouthe Schal Delyvere from a poem Truth by Geoffrey Chaucer.

== Ethos of the school ==
KEHS hosts approximately 660 girls, approx. 80 per year (four forms) with entrance exams taking place in late January. Students engage in various extra-curricular activities and community service. Each year, forms elect a charity to support and later raise funds through such activities as cake sell hosting, car washing and similar activities.

Unlike state secondary schools and in common with many independent schools, KEHS does not use modern year group names, e.g. Year 11, Year 12, etc.

The table below attempts to clarify the names of forms used for the different years:

Name of Form	Year
Thirds (3rds)	7
Lower Fourth (L4s)	8
Upper Fourth (U4s)	9
Lower Fifth (L5s)	10	First year of GCSE study
Upper Fifth (U5s)	11	Second year of GCSE study
Lower Sixth (L6s)	12	First year of A-Level study
Upper Sixth (U6s)	13	Final year of A-Level study

== Music and drama ==
The school works in partnership with the adjoining boys' school in many orchestras, choirs, and drama productions. During the course of the year there are several plays in which both schools participate.

Towards the end of the year, upper sixth form pupils from both schools organise and rehearse a Syndicate play, usually performed in the last week of term.

Throughout the year there are six lunchtime concerts, held in the concert hall of King Edward's School.

The boys' school and KEHS share the performing arts centre, completed in 2012. It has several drama studios and a tiered seated hall for assemblies and orchestra performances.

In May 2018, KEHS pupil and pianist Lauren Zhang won the biennial BBC Young Musician.

== Sports and outdoor activities ==
Activities are run during the lunch hour but some may also take place after school when both training and matches take place. As well as staff within the department organising teams, the school also has a number of external coaches.

KEHS runs a Duke of Edinburgh's Award Scheme where girls can gain Bronze, Silver and Gold Awards. It now runs a residential activities week for all of the first years at Condover Hall. Each year the school plans to offer students in year 8 the opportunity to take part in Voyager expeditions whilst in year 9 students will be able to take part in First Challenge expeditions. Cycling Tours and Ski Trips are offered throughout the year, and weekly Climbing and Cross Country clubs add to the already large range of outdoors activities on offer.

Activities on offer during the course of the year are:

- Archery
- Athletics
- Cheerleading
- Gymnastics
- Hockey
- Badminton
- Lifesaving
- Netball
- Dance
- Rounders
- Fencing
- Swimming
- Football
- Tennis
- Ultimate Frisbee
- Gymnastics
- Volleyball
- Water polo

== Notable alumnae ==
- Margaret "Peggy" Bacon, BBC radio and television producer and radio presenter
- Celia Barlow, Labour MP and BBC home news editor
- Reeta Chakrabarti, BBC political correspondent
- Lindsay Duncan, actress
- Gillian Evans, philosopher
- Karthi Gnanasegaram, BBC presenter
- Winifred Hackett, guided weapons and early computer engineer
- Anita Harding, neurologist
- Natalie Haynes, comedian and writer
- Annie Homer, biochemist
- Joanne Johnson, polar scientist
- Sally Jones, TV presenter
- Olga Kevelos, Motorbike trials rider
- Vivien Knight (1953-2009), art historian and gallerist
- Ida Maclean, biochemist
- Georgina Lee, Olympic swimmer
- Dorothy Jordan Lloyd, protein scientist
- Dame Hilda Lloyd, first woman professor at Birmingham University and first female president of the Royal College of Obstetricians and Gynaecologists
- Huma Qureshi (journalist) author
- Monisha Rajesh author
- Constance Savery, novelist and author of children's books
- Mary Stallard, Anglican bishop
- Dame Rachel Waterhouse, historian

== Notable former staff ==
- Edith Creak, founding head of two schools
- Florence A. George, cookery mistress and cookbook author
- Janet Ruth Bacon, Principal, Royal Holloway College 1935–44
- Agnes Murgoci, zoologist, folklorist and teacher

== Sources ==
- Waterhouse, Rachel (1983). King Edward VI High School Birmingham 1883–1983.
