= Edith Creak =

British headteacher in Brighton (1855–1919)

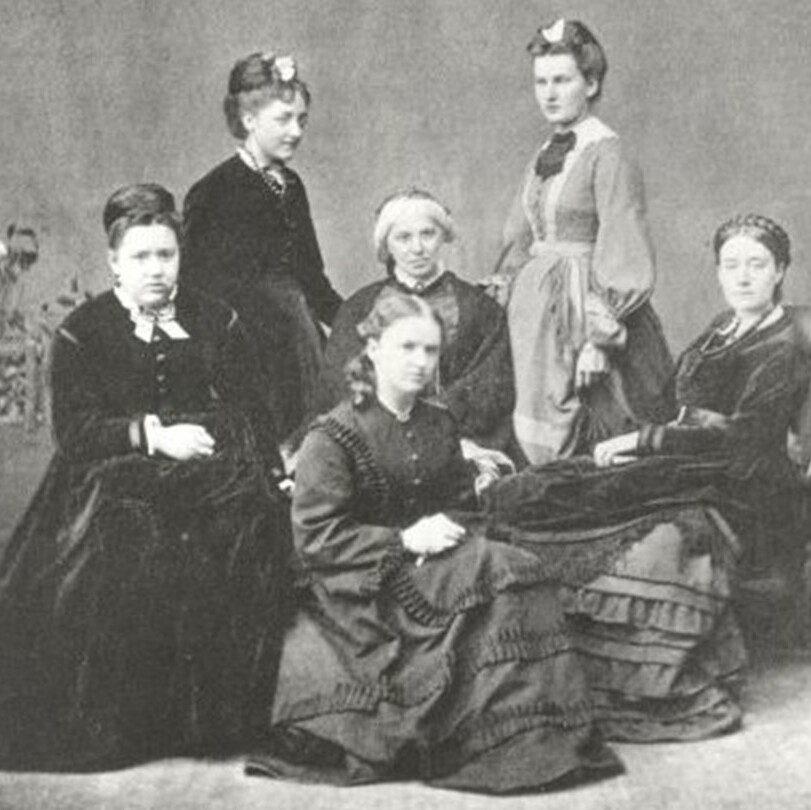
- First five students at Newnham. Edith Creak on the left and Principal Anne Clough on the right
- Born: 26 July 1855; Hove
- Died: 20 May 1919 (aged 63); Edgbaston
- Alma mater: Newnham College; University College London

Edith Elizabeth Maria Creak (1855 – 1919) was one of the first five students at Newnham College, Cambridge and the founding head of two girls' schools: Brighton and Hove High School, at the age of twenty, and King Edward VI High School for Girls in Birmingham.

== Life ==
Creak was born in 1855. Her parents were Bertha Creak (née Shelly) and Albert Creak who ran a school for boys in Hove. Her father was a Protestant minister and an alumnus of London University. She received a good education, and she was chosen at age sixteen to be one of the first five students at Newnham Hall when it was founded in Cambridge in 1871. Creak had won a scholarship in 1870 that was funded by the feminist Helen Taylor and her step-father, the politician John Stuart Mill. The other students were Mary Paley Marshall, Mary Kennedy, Ella Bulley and Annie Migault. Women who studied at Cambridge University were not awarded degrees until the mid-twentieth century, so although Creak achieved a second-class pass in Classics and a third in Mathematics, she had to take another examination at University of London to obtain a degree in 1879. This was one of the first University of London degrees which were awarded to women. The other three who all received second-class degrees were Elizabeth Hills, Marianne Andrews and Clara Collet.

She was employed by the Girls' Day School Trust and at the age of twenty she became the head of their new school in Brighton. It was called "Brighton High School", and it was the Trust's tenth school when it opened in June 1876. It was based at Milton House on Brighton's Montpelier Road, and it initially had seventeen pupils. She moved the school in 1879 to its permanent location at "The Temple" on Montpelier Road.

In 1883, Creak became the founding head of the Girls' Day School Trust's new girls' school in Birmingham. She was a successful head but as she grew older, she became more conservative. She had supported women's suffrage, but she turned against the idea and established a Birmingham branch of the Women's National Anti-Suffrage League in 1908. Her attitude led to her resignation in 1910. She died on 20 May 1919.
