= Mrs Mary Eales's Receipts =

1718 book of recipes

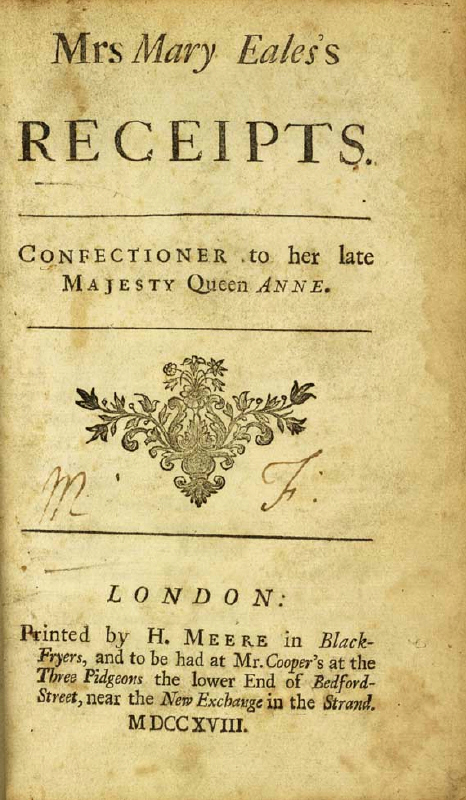
Title page of Mrs Mary Eales's Receipts (1718 edition)

Mrs. Mary Eales's Receipts was published in London by Mary Eales in 1718 and again in 1733, the second time also under the title of The Compleat Confectioner. It was published in 1744 with an additional called A curious collection of receipts in cookery, pickling, family physick, &c. added by the publisher, R. Montagu. (The author of the latter part is unknown.) A facsimile of the 1733 edition was published in 1985 by Prospect Books (ISBN 0-907325-25-4).

== Identity of the writer ==
Mrs. Mary Eales is listed on the cover as confectioner to her late Majesty Queen Anne; there is no external verification or disproval of this claim. It was the first English cookbook to include a recipe for ice cream. Many of the recipes are of the form of "To preserve something", or "To dry something", with many of the rest being recipes for creams, jams, jellies, or pastes, with the occasional chip, cake or biscuit recipe. The 1733 edition has 126 recipes and is exactly 100 pages long, plus the title page and table of contents.

== Examples of recipes ==
Two of the 126 recipes in the 1733 edition:

To ice CREAM.

Take Tin Ice-Pots, fill them with any Sort of Cream you like, either plain or sweeten'd, or Fruit in it; shut your Pots very close; to six Pots you must allow eighteen or twenty Pound of Ice, breaking the Ice very small; there will be some great Pieces, which lay at the Bottom and Top: You must have a Pail, and lay some Straw at the Bottom; then lay in your Ice, and put in amongst it a Pound of Bay-Salt; set in your Pots of Cream, and lay Ice and Salt between every Pot, that they may not touch; but the Ice must lie round them on every Side; lay a good deal of Ice on the Top, cover the Pail with Straw, set it in a Cellar where no Sun or Light comes, it will be froze in four Hours, but it may stand longer; than take it out just as you use it; hold it in your Hand and it will slip out. When you wou'd freeze any Sort of Fruit, either Cherries, Raspberries, Currants, or Strawberries, fill your Tin-Pots with the Fruit, but as hollow as you can; put to them Lemmonade, made with Spring-Water and Lemmon-Juice sweeten'd; put enough in the Pots to make the Fruit hang together, and put them in Ice as you do Cream.

To dry GOOSBERRIES.

Take the large white Goosberries before they are very ripe, but at full Growth, stone and wash them, and to a Pound of Goosberries put a Pound and half of Sugar, beat very fine, and half a Pint of Water; set them on the Fire; when the Sugar is melted, let them boil, but not too fast; take them off once or twice, that they may not break; when they begin to look clear, they are enough: Let them stand all Night in the Pan they are boil'd in, with a Paper laid close to them; the next Day scald them very well, and let them stand a Day or two; then lay them on Plates, sift them with Sugar very well, and put them in the Stove, turning them every Day 'till they are dry; the third Time of turning, you may lay them on a Sieve, if you please; when they are pretty dry, place them in a Box, with Paper betwixt every Row.

== Notes ==
- Pennell, S. M. "Eales, Mary". Oxford Dictionary of National Biography (online ed.). Oxford University Press. doi:10.1093/ref:odnb/65132. (Subscription, Wikipedia Library access or UK public library membership required.)
