= Agnes Marshall =

English cookery writer (1852–1905)

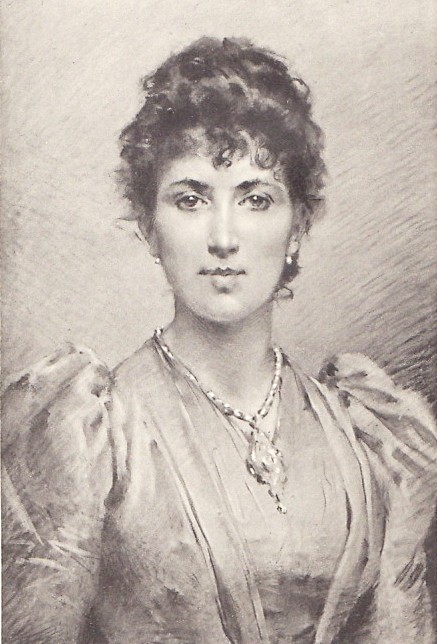
- Engraved portrait published in Mrs A. B. Marshall's Larger Cookery Book of Extra Recipes (1891)
- Born: Agnes Beere Smith; 24 August 1852; Haggerston, London, England
- Died: 29 July 1905 (aged 52); Pinner, London, England
- Occupations: Cook, inventor, entrepreneur
- Spouse: Alfred William Marshall
- Children: 4

Agnes Bertha Marshall (born Agnes Beere Smith; 24 August 1852 – 29 July 1905) was an English culinary entrepreneur, inventor, and celebrity chef. An unusually prominent businesswoman for her time, Marshall was particularly known for her work on ice cream and other frozen desserts, which in Victorian England earned her the moniker "Queen of Ices". Marshall popularised ice cream in England and elsewhere at a time when it was still a novelty and is often regarded as the inventor of the modern ice cream cone. Through her work, Marshall may be largely responsible for both the look and popularity of ice cream today.

She began her career in 1883 through the founding of the Marshall's School of Cookery, which taught high-end English and French cuisine and grew to be a renowned culinary school. She wrote four well-received cookbooks, two of which were devoted to ice cream and other desserts. Together with her husband Alfred, Marshall operated a variety of different businesses. From 1886 onward, she published her own magazine, The Table, which included weekly recipes and at times articles written by Marshall on various topics, both serious and frivolous.

Although she was one of the most celebrated cooks of her time and one of the foremost cookery writers of the Victorian age, Marshall rapidly faded into obscurity after her death and was largely forgotten. However, technology invented or conceptualised by Marshall, including her ice cream freezer and the idea of creating ice cream with the use of liquid nitrogen, have since become repopularised.

== Personal life ==
For years it was believed that Agnes Bertha Smith was born on 24 August 1855 in Walthamstow, Essex, and was the daughter of John Smith, who worked as a clerk, and his wife Susan.

Recent research has discovered that she was three years older than she claimed; and her birth certificate shows that she was in fact born on 24 August 1852 in Haggerston, in the East End of London, as Agnes Beere Smith, the illegitimate daughter of Susan Smith. Her birth was registered in the customary fashion for illegitimate births under her mother's surname, and giving the father's name, 'Beere', as an extra forename. She was raised by her maternal grandmother, Sarah Smith, in Walthamstow, and can be found living there in the 1861 census.

Her mother Susan then had three further illegitimate children with a man named Charles Wells: Mary Sarah Wells Smith (1859), John Osborn Wells Smith (1863) and Ada Martha Wells Smith (1868). Susan and Charles Wells were married in 1869, and the children thereafter discarded the surname Smith.

Nothing is known of how, where or when she learned to cook. According to a later article in the Pall Mall Gazette, she had "made a thorough study of cookery since she was a child, and has practiced at Paris and with Vienna's celebrated chefs". In the preface to her first book, Marshall wrote that she had received "practical training and lessons, through several years, from leading English and Continental authorities". This seems unlikely, coming from a poor background in the East End of London, and the 1878 birth certificate for her daughter Ethel describes her as a domestic servant. She is probably the eighteen year-old, born in Walthamstow, working as a kitchen maid in Ayot St Lawrence, Herts., in the 1871 census.

In April 1878, "Agnes Beer [sic] Smith", domestic servant, gave birth to a daughter, Ethel Doyle Smith, in Dalston and the birth certificate indicates that the father's name was Doyle, and not, as generally assumed, her future husband. A few months later, on 17 August 1878, she married Alfred William Marshall, son of a builder named Thomas Marshall, at St. George's Church, Hanover Square. The couple had three children: Agnes Alfreda (called "Aggie", born 1879), Alfred Harold (born 1880), and William Edward (born 1882). Daughter Ethel was raised as one of the family; and at some date Agnes changed her second forename to Bertha.

== Career ==
=== Business ventures and The Book of Ices ===
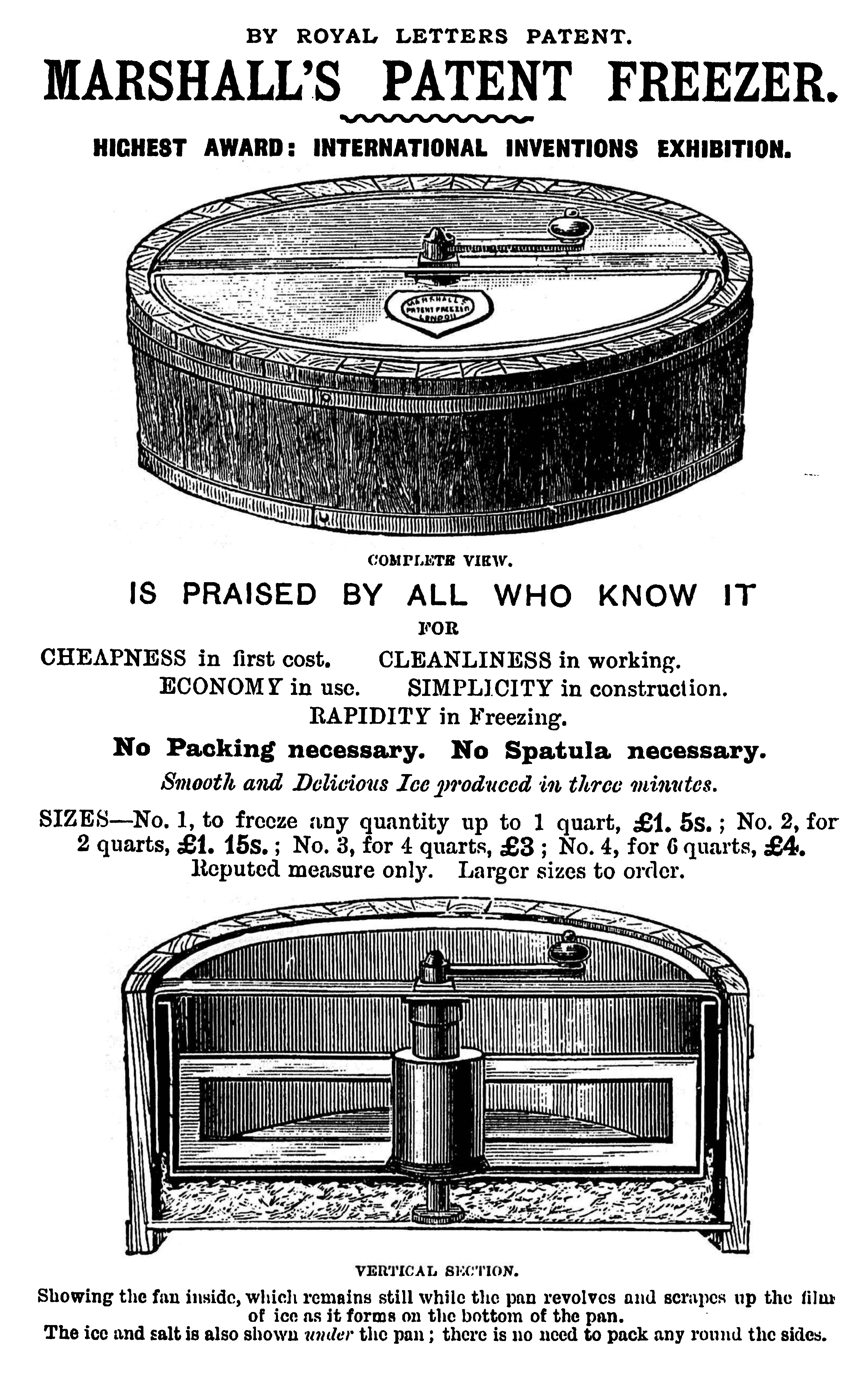
Advertisement for the Marshall's Patent Freezer

Marshall was a formidable businesswoman even by modern standards. In January 1883, she and her husband acquired the Lavenue cookery school which was situated at 67 Mortimer Street, and renamed it the Marshall's School of Cookery.

The school was founded by Felix Lavenue, the pseudonym of Englishman Charles Shepperd, who died in 1864. In 1883, it was being run by his daughter, Agnes Mary Lavenue, and she died in Tunbridge Wells a few months after the sale. The Marylebone rate books show that 67 Mortimer Street was scheduled for demolition in 1883, and soon after the purchase the Marshalls moved the school down the road to 30 Mortimer St. Agnes's half-brother John was employed as the school's manager, and half-sister Ada worked for a time as the housekeeper. The original records of the transaction have not survived but later evidence suggests that the couple purchased the school together, and this was unusual as women had only very recently earned the legal right to purchase property through the Married Women's Property Act 1882.

The Marshall's School of Cookery mainly taught a mixture of high-end English and French cuisine and swiftly became one of only two major cookery schools in the city, alongside The National Training School Of Cookery. A year into the school's operation, Marshall was lecturing classes of up to 40 students five to six times a week and within a few years the school reportedly had nearly 2,000 students, lectured in cooking by prominent specialists. Among the lectures offered at the school were lessons in curry-making, taught by an English colonel who had once served in India and a class in French high-end cuisine taught by a Le Cordon Bleu graduate. The couple also operated a business involving the creation and retail of cooking equipment, an agency that supplied domestic staff, as well as a food shop that sold flavorings, spices and syrups.

In 1885, Marshall wrote and published her first book, The Book of Ices, which contained 177 different ice cream and dessert recipes. The Book of Ices was self-published through the cookery school and was well-written and thoroughly illustrated. In addition to the recipes, the book also promoted some of Marshall's ice cream-related inventions, including the Marshall's Patent Freezer. The Book of Ices received favourable reviews from critics but it mainly received attention in various local newspapers and did not reach the national-level media.

The Marshall's Patent Freezer, patented by her husband, was able to freeze a pint of ice cream in less than five minutes and her design remains faster and more reliable than even many modern electric ice cream machines. Marshall also designed an extensive range of over a thousand different moulds for use with ice cream. She also invented an "ice-breaking machine", an "ice cave" (an insulated box for storing ice cream), and several different kitchen appliances and food ingredients, sold by her company.

=== The Table and A Pretty Luncheon ===
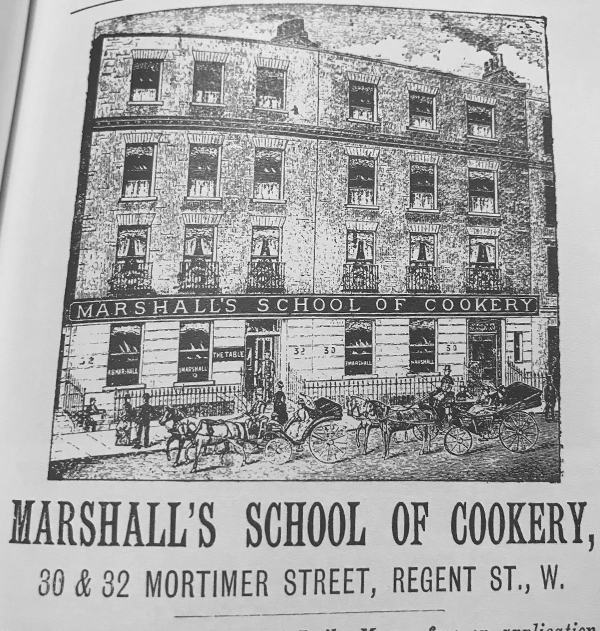
Advertisement for the Marshall's School of Cookery

From 1886 onwards, Marshall and her husband published the magazine The Table, a weekly paper on "Cookery, Gastronomy [and] food amusements". Every issue of The Table was accompanied by a weekly recipe contributed by Marshall and for the first six month (and periodically thereafter) the magazine also included weekly articles written by Marshall on an assortment of subjects she took an interest in. According to the historian John Deith, these articles were written in a "chatty, witty and ironic, Jane Austenesque style". Among the articles she wrote were musings on hobbies such as riding, playing tennis, and gardening, as well as spirited attacks on The National Training School Of Cookery (the main competitor of her own school). She also published articles in support of improving the working conditions of kitchen staff in aristocratic homes, which she wrote "received less respect than carriage horses". At one point, Marshall authored a highly critical article on a financial venture of Horatio Bottomley, who printed The Table, which resulted in Bottomley threatening legal action (which never materialised) and refusing to print future critical material. Marshall responded by simply calling Bottomley "impudent" and partnering with another printer.

In 1887, Marshall was preparing to publish her second book, Mrs A. B. Marshall's Book of Cookery, set for publication in February 1888. Wishing to reach a wider audience than she had with The Book of Ices, Marshall decided to embark on a promotional tour across England which she dubbed A Pretty Luncheon. In addition to promoting the upcoming book, the tour also served to bring attention to her cookery school and to her various businesses. The tour saw Marshall cooking meals in front of large audiences, helped on stage by a team of assistants. A Pretty Luncheon began in August 1888, with the shows held in Birmingham, Manchester, Leeds, Newcastle and Glasgow. On 15 and 22 October, Marshall held two successive shows at the Willis's Rooms in London which received unanimous and widespread critical acclaim. Encouraged by the success of the first part of the tour, Marshall embarked on the second part of the tour in the autumn and winter, cooking in front of audiences in Bath, Brighton, Bristol, Cheltenham, Colchester, Leicester, Liverpool, Nottingham, Plymouth, Shrewsbury, Southampton and Worcester. Some of her shows had as many as 500–600 attendants in the audience. According to Deith, A Pretty Luncheon made Marshall into "the most talked about cook in England" and "the best known cook since Soyer".

=== Further writings and late career ===
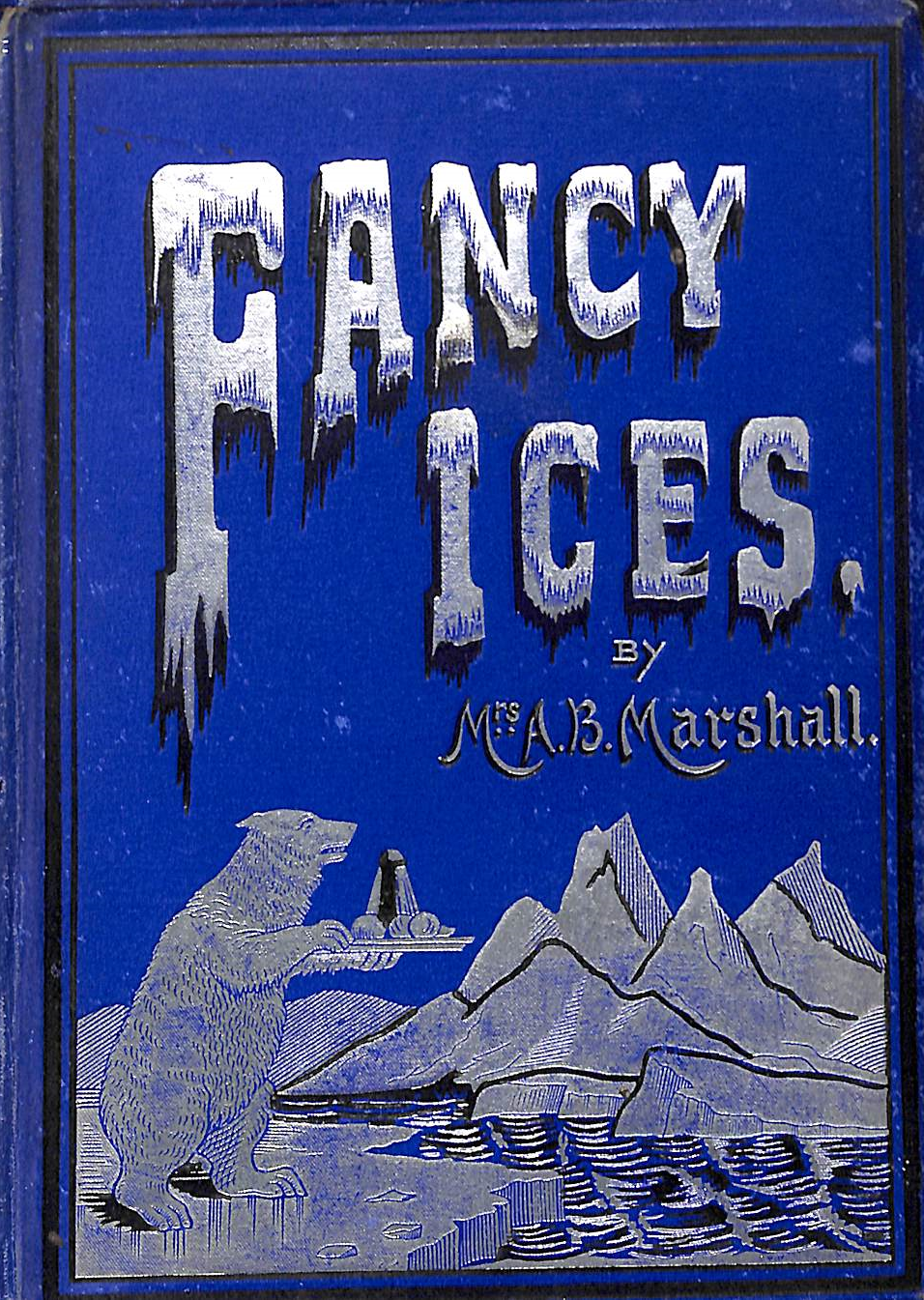
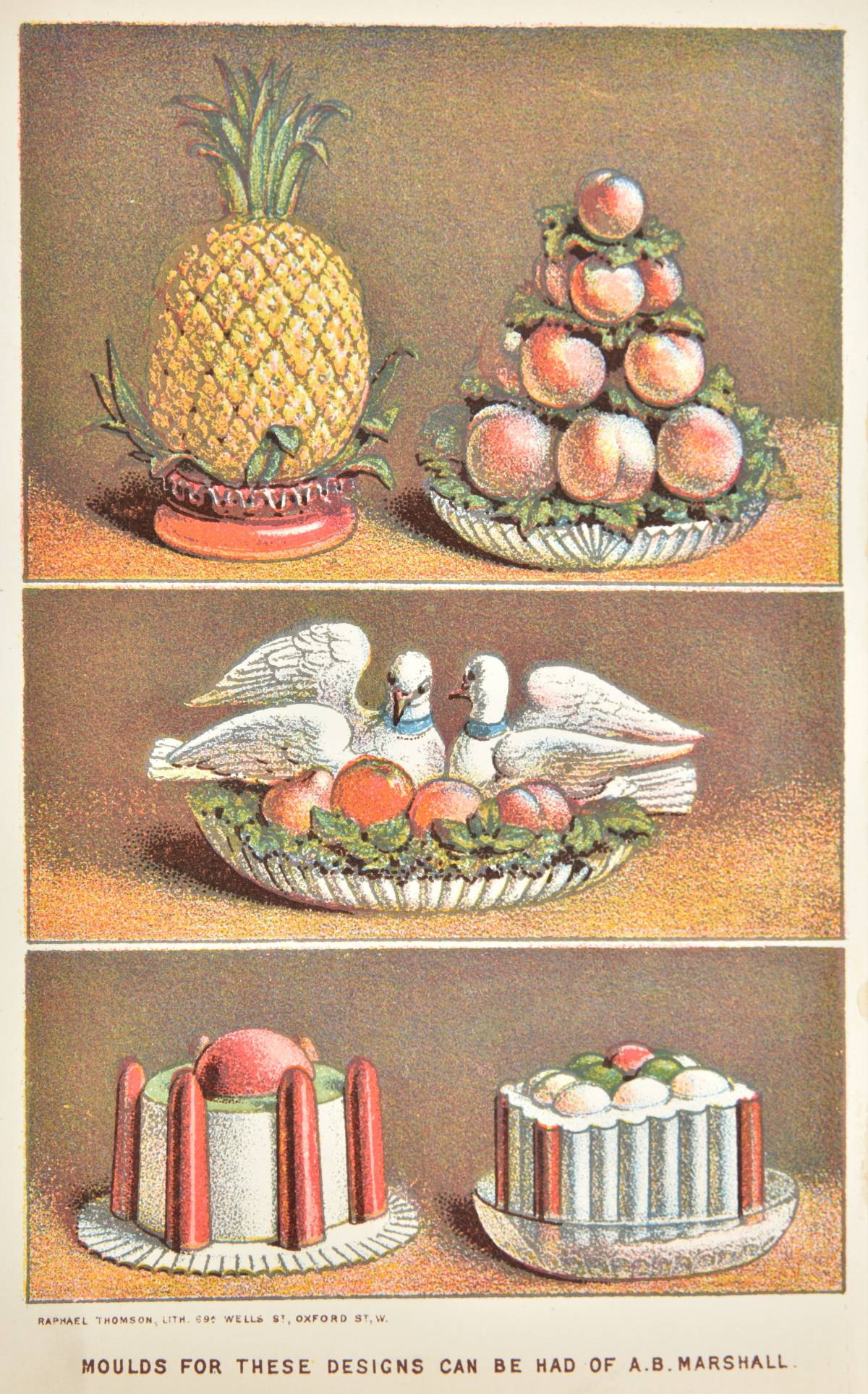
Cover of Fancy Ices (1894; left) and an illustration from the book depicting various "fancy" examples of moulded ice cream (right)

After some delays, Mrs A. B. Marshall's Book of Cookery was published on 12 May 1888. Well-planned, well-written and practically arranged, the book was an enormous success, selling over 60,000 copies and being published in fifteen editions. Book of Cookery cemented Marshall's reputation among the prominent cooks of England. In Book of Cookery, Marshall mentioned putting ice cream in an edible cone, the earliest known reference in English to ice cream cones. Her cone, which she called a "cornet", was made from ground almonds and might have been the first portable and edible ice cream cone. Marshall's cornet bore little resemblance to its modern counterpart and was intended to be eaten with utensils but Marshall is nevertheless frequently considered to be the inventor of the modern ice cream cone.

In the summer of 1888, Marshall went on a tour to the United States. Her lecture received a positive review in the Philadelphia Bulletin but she did not achieve the same level of acclaim in America as she had in England. Marshall is recorded to have provided Christmas dinners for the "Hungry Poor" in Stepney and Poplar in London in 1889. She also provided warm soup to the poor throughout the winter of that year.

Book of Cookery was followed by her third book, Mrs A. B. Marshall's Larger Cookery Book of Extra Recipes (1891), dedicated "by permission" to Princess Helena and devoted to more high-end cuisine than the previous book. Her fourth and final book, Fancy Ices, was published in 1894 and was a follow-up to The Book of Ices. The cooking books written by Marshall contained recipes she had created herself, unlike many other books of the age which were simply compilations of work by others, and she assured readers that she had tried out every recipe herself. Among the various foods featured, Marshall's books contain the earliest known written recipe for Cumberland rum butter.

In the 1890s, Marshall also resumed her weekly articles on various subjects in The Table, writing on both serious and frivolous topics. Among the articles she wrote during this time were musings on the poor quality of food on trains and at railway stations, a denouncement of canned food, a lament on the lack of good-quality tomatoes in her area, support for women's rights, criticism of superstition, and speculations on future technology. She made several correct predictions for the future; Marshall predicted that motor cars would "revolutionise trade and facilitate the travelling of the future", speculated on how refrigerated lorries could be used to deliver fresh food nationwide, predicted that larger stores would bring small provision shops out of business, and that chemically purified water might one day be provided to all homes as a matter of course. Marshall was greatly interested in technological developments and her shop was an early adopter of technologies such as the dishwasher, the teasmade and automatic doors.

== Death and legacy ==
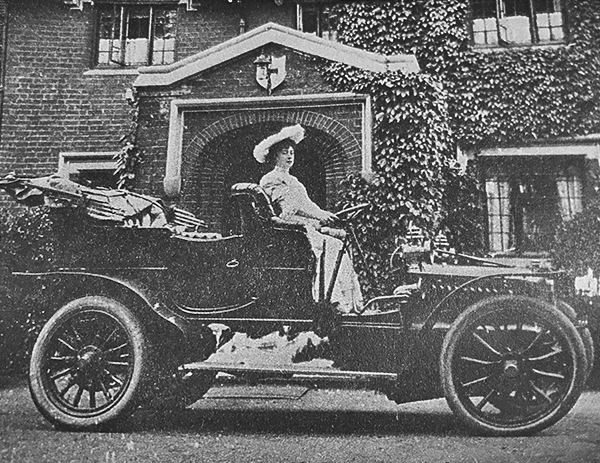
Early 1900s photograph of Agnes Marshall in a car

In 1904, Marshall fell from a horse and suffered injuries from which she never properly recovered. She died of cancer the next year, on 29 July 1905, at The Towers, Pinner. The Towers was a large estate purchased and refurbished by Marshall in 1891. Marshall was cremated at the Golders Green Crematorium and her ashes were interred at the Paines Lane Cemetery in Pinner. Alfred remarried within a year of her death to Gertrude Walsh, a former secretary that Marshall had previously fired. The two had likely been engaged in an affair before Marshall's death. Their son Alfred died in 1907 and his ashes were interred next to Marshall's. The elder Alfred died in 1917 in Nice during World War I; his ashes were at his request also interred next to Marshall's in 1920.

Marshall was one of the most celebrated cooks of her time and one of the foremost cookery writers of the Victorian age, particularly on ice cream. Her recipes were renowned for their detail, simplicity and accuracy. For her work on ice cream and other frozen desserts, Marshall in her lifetime earned the nickname "Queen of Ices". Only a single book on ice cream is known from England before Marshall's work and she helped popularise ice cream at a time when the concept was still novel in England and elsewhere, particularly through the portable ice cream freezer and the ice cream cone. Before Marshall's writings and innovations, ice cream was often sold frozen to metal rods which had to be returned after all had been licked off and was mainly enjoyed by just the upper classes. She increased the popularity of ice cream to such an extent that she was credited for causing an increase in ice imports from Norway. In 1901, she became the first person known to have suggested the use of liquid nitrogen to freeze ice cream (and the first to suggest using liquified gas on food in general). Marshall imagined this would be the ideal method to make ice cream since the ice cream could be created in seconds and the ice crystals resulting from this method would be tiny, as desired.

Despite her fame in life, Marshall's reputation declined rapidly after her death and her name faded into obscurity. Her husband continued to operate their businesses but they declined without Marshall's personality and drive. In 1921, the company was sold and became a limited company and in 1954 it ceased operations. Marshall's cookery school remained in operation until the outbreak of World War II. The Table also continued to be published to around the same time. The rights to her books were sold off to the publishing house Ward Lock at some time in 1927 or 1928, though Ward Lock had little interest in keeping them in print. In the 1950s, a fire destroyed much of Marshall's personal papers which further pushed her into obscurity.

More recently, from the late 20th century onwards, Marshall's reputation has been restored as one of the most prominent cooks of the Victorian age. The cookery writer Elizabeth David referred to her as the "famous Mrs Marshall" in the posthumously published Harvest of the Cold Months (1994) and the author Robin Weir declared her to have been "the greatest Victorian ice cream maker" in a 1998 biographical study. Weir assessed Marshall in 2015 as a "unique one-woman industry" whose achievements were "arguably unequalled" and who "deserves much more credit than she has been given by history". Since the late 20th century, Marshall's books have once more been reprinted and ice cream freezers based on her original designs are once again in commercial use. Using liquid nitrogen to freeze ice cream has also become an increasingly popular trend. A liquid nitrogen ice cream store that was inspired by Marshall's proposed technique was opened in 2014 in St. Louis, Missouri and named "Ices Plain & Fancy" after her book.
