= Fort Street Public School =

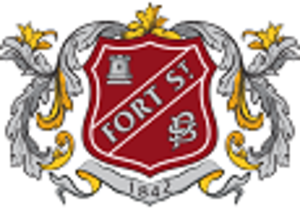

Location
- Upper Fort Street; Millers Point, New South Wales; Australia; 33°51′38″S 151°12′18″E

Information
- Type: Public, co-educational, primary, day school
- Motto: Success Through Diligence
- Established: 1849; 177 years ago
- Principal: Michele Peel-Yates
- Enrolment: 86 (2011); 123 (2014); 220 (2018)
- Campus type: Urban
- Colours: Maroon, navy
- Website: fortstreet-p.schools.nsw.gov.au

Fort Street Public School (abbreviated as FSPS) is a government co-educational primary school located in Millers Point, a suburb of Sydney, Australia. Established in 1849, it is one of the oldest government schools in Australia, and is operated by the New South Wales Department of Education.

== History ==
Fort Street Public School descends from Fort Street Model School, established in 1849 and the first government model school in the colony of New South Wales. The school is one of the oldest public schools in Australia.

The history of public education in Australia began when the Governor of New South Wales Charles FitzRoy established a Board of National Education on 8 January 1848 to implement a national system of education throughout the colony. The board decided to create two model schools, one for boys and one for girls. The site of Fort Street Model School was chosen as the old Military Hospital at Fort Phillip, on Sydney's Observatory Hill. This school was not only intended to educate boys and girls, but also to serve as a model for other schools in the colony. The school's name is derived from the name of a street which ran into the grounds of the hospital and became part of the playground during its reconstruction.

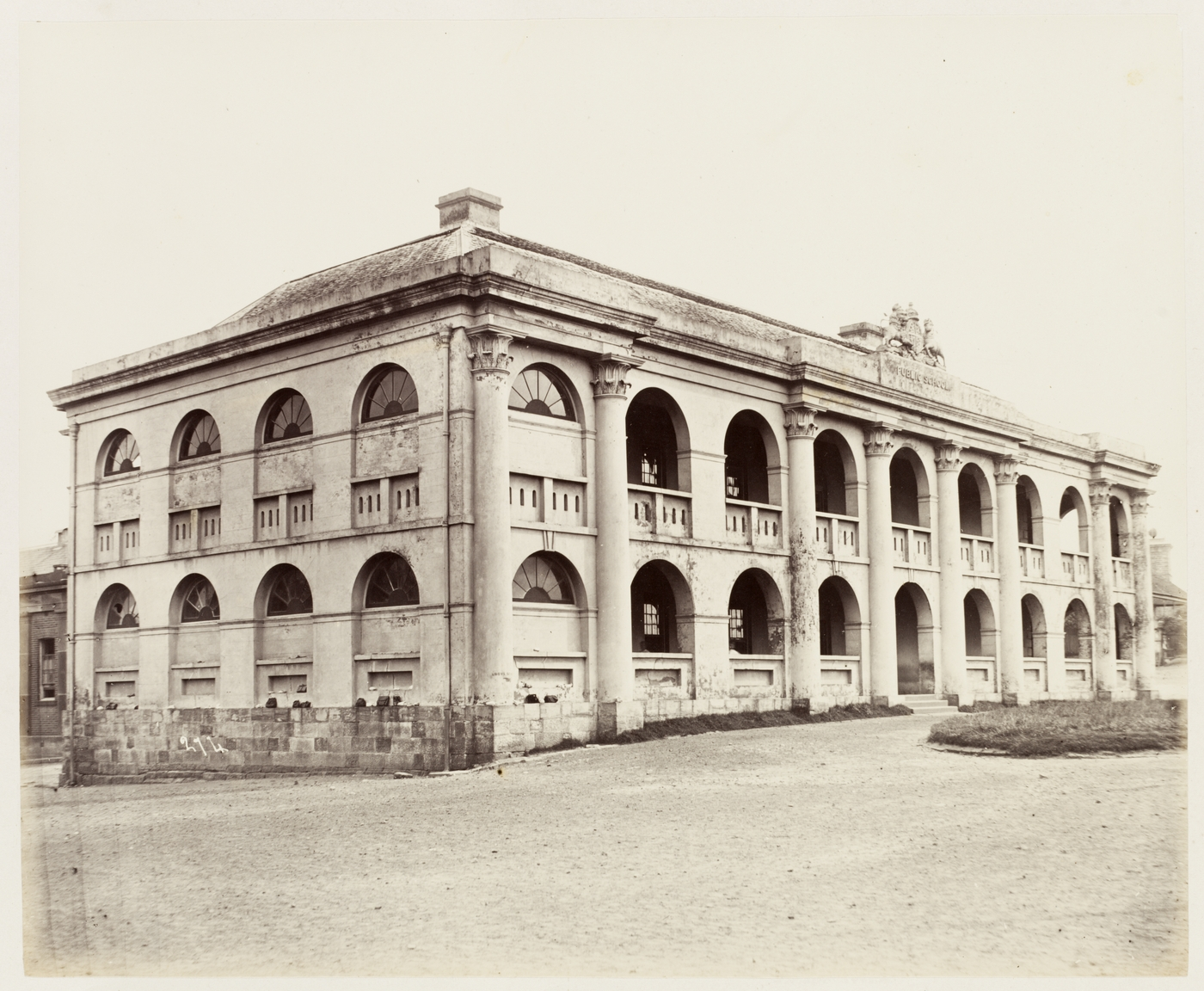
Fort Street Model School in 1872

From the 1850s the Model School offered both primary and secondary education, and was associated with Fort Street Training School, which trained all public school teachers in the colony. The school became Fort Street Superior Public School in 1881.

Ann Fawcett Story was employed to introduce cookery as a subject in 1889. She was promoted each year and in 1891 she was supervising the teaching and specifying the cookery curriculum. In the following year the school began to train new teachers buying portable cookery facilities. She resigned in 1896 after a dispute when she was visiting twelve different locations. The teaching of cookery that she had created continued managed by district inspectors. In 1905 five women began to train to teach cookery with Hannah Rankin including Emily Winifred Savage.

In 1911, the school separated into a primary school, Fort Street Public School, and two high schools, Fort Street Boys' and Fort Street Girls'. The Public School has remained on Observatory Hill near the Model School's original building, which now houses the National Trust of Australia.

The secondary section's girls' school and boys' school moved at different times to Petersham, where they amalgamated to become Fort Street High School. There is now no direct relationship between the primary and secondary schools.

On 24 November 2016, Queen Rania of Jordan visited the school as part of a state visit with her husband, King Abdullah II of Jordan.

On Day 1 Term 4, 2020, the school relocated to temporary structures in Wentworth Park to facilitate an upgrade of the school site at Observatory Hill. The upgrade is expected to be completed in July 2023.

== Enrolments ==
In 2011, the school had an enrolment number of 86 students. The number of students grew significantly since then, as in 2014 the enrolment was 123 students. (Note: The enrolment figures for 2010 (89) and 2014 (162) shows an increase of 82%.) In 2018 the school reported an enrolment of 220 students.

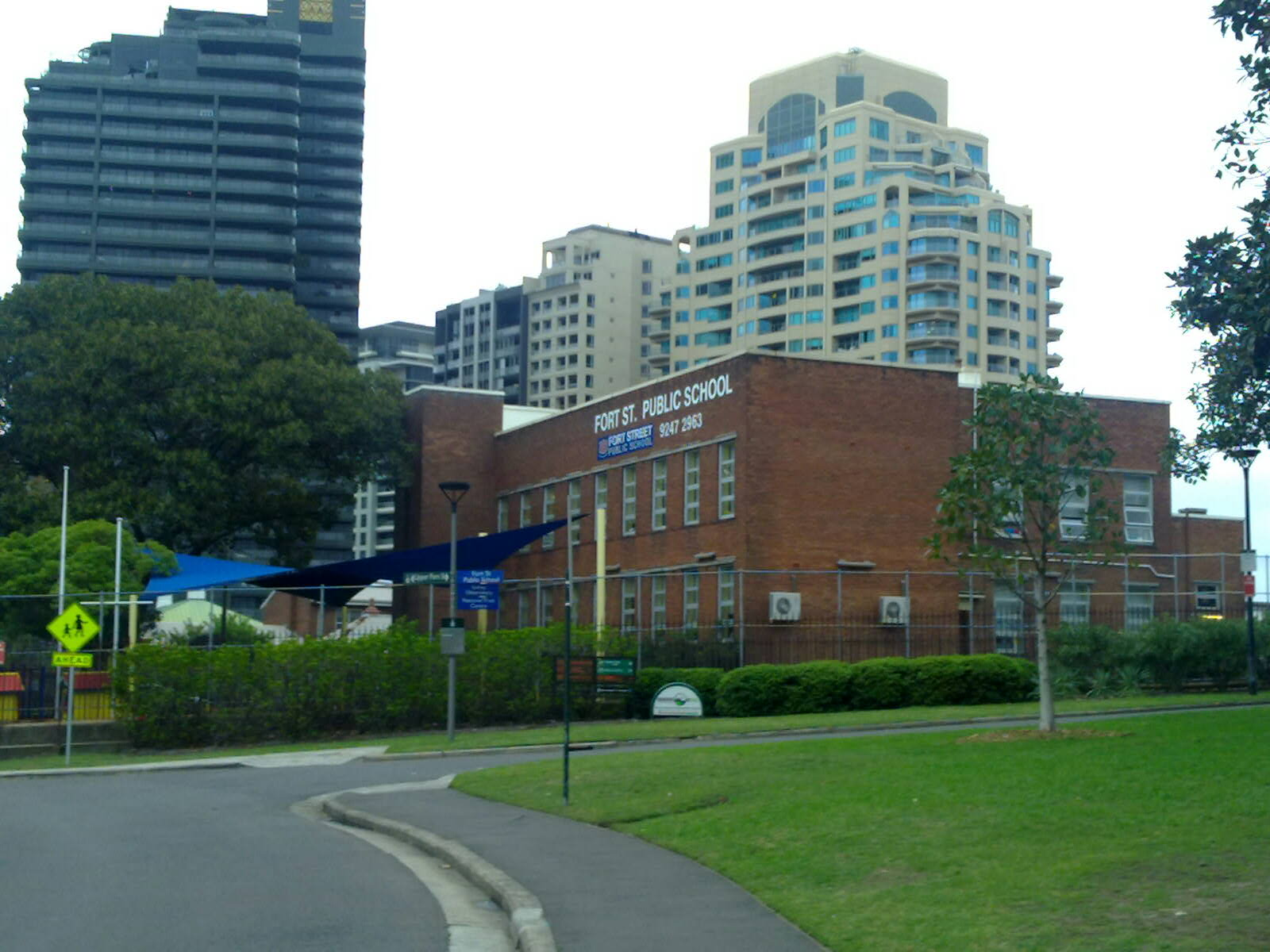
FSPS view to south 2014

== School traditions ==
=== Student leadership ===
At the end of each year, a Year 5 student is elected School Captain for the next year by the student body, and another as Vice Captain. At the beginning of each year, House Captains are elected by the student body.

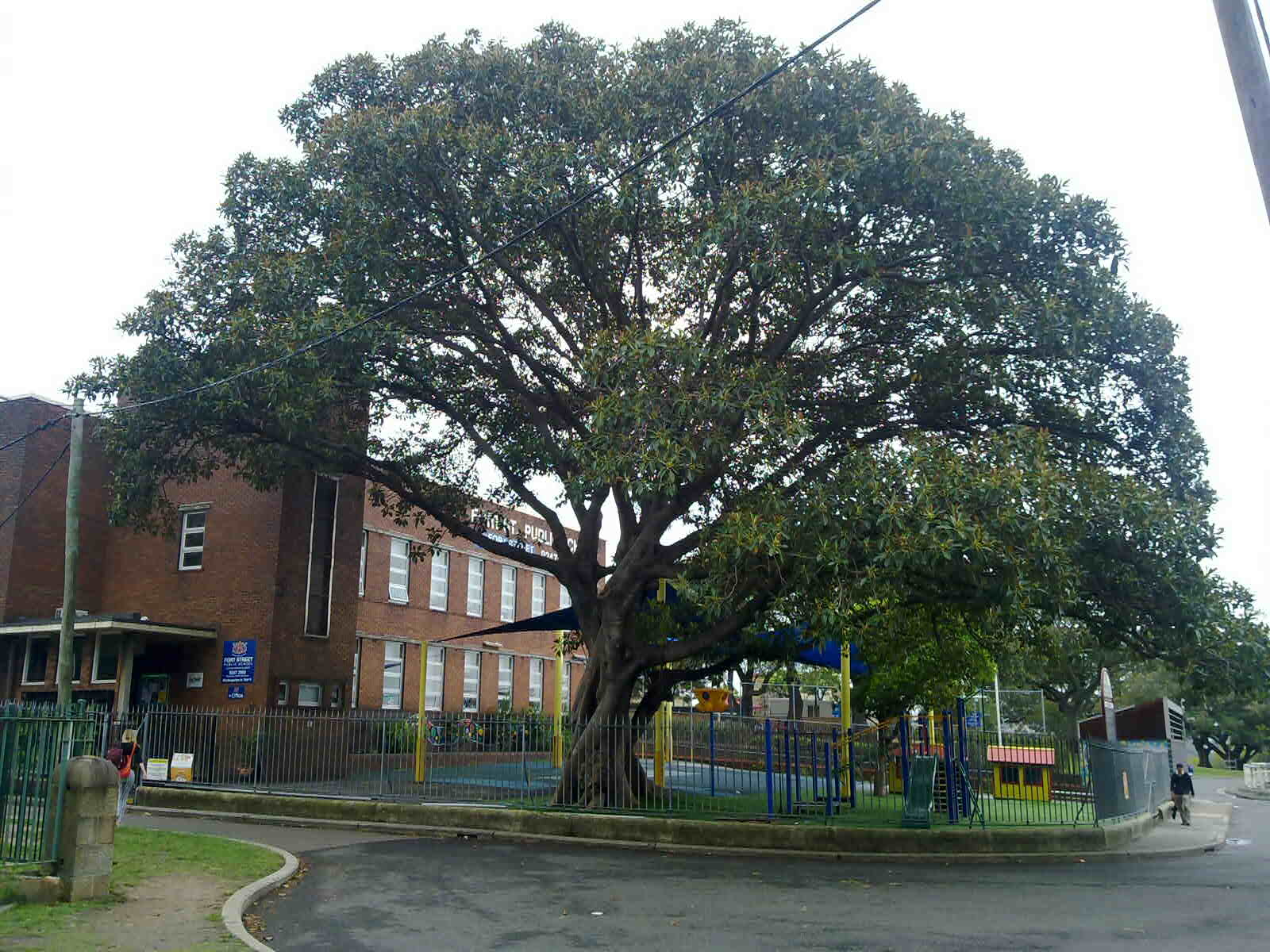
School building, seen from Upper Fort Street looking north.

=== Houses ===
As with most Australian schools, FSPS uses a house system. Students are allocated to a house when they enter the school. There are four different houses which students compete under in sports Carnivals and other activities:

- Argyle (Red)
- Cumberland (Green)
- Kent (Blue)
- Watson (Yellow)

All of the houses are named after streets in The Rocks.

== Alumni ==
Some early alumni (such as Edmund Barton) were educated at the school prior to its separation into a primary and two secondary schools, and are counted as alumni by both the Public School and the High School: see List of Fortians for these.

Some other notable Fort Street Public School alumni include Emily Winifred Savage who learned cookery under Hannah Rankin in 1905. Australian politicians who were alumni include Arthur Grimm, Henry Hoyle, James Shand, John Daniel FitzGerald, Patrick Quinn and Richard McCoy.

== See also ==
- List of Government schools in New South Wales: A–F
