= Vulgarity =

Quality of being common, coarse, or unrefined

Vulgarity is the quality of being common, coarse, or unrefined. This judgement may refer to language, visual art, social class, or social climbers. John Bayley said that the term can never be used self-referentially, because to be aware of vulgarity is to display a degree of sophistication which thereby elevates the subject above the vulgar.

== Evolution of the term ==
From the fifteenth to seventeenth centuries, "vulgar" simply described the common language or vernacular of a country. From the mid-seventeenth century onward, it began to take on a pejorative aspect: "having a common and offensively mean character, coarsely commonplace; lacking in refinement or good taste; uncultured; ill bred".

In the Victorian age, vulgarity broadly described many activities, such as wearing ostentatious clothing. In a George Eliot novel, one character could be vulgar for talking about money, a second because he criticizes the first for doing so, and a third for being fooled by the excessive refinement of the second. The effort to avoid vulgar phrasing could leave characters at a loss for words. In George Meredith's Beauchamp's Career, an heiress does not wish to make the commonplace statement that she is "engaged", nor "betrothed", "affianced", or "plighted". Though such words are not vulgarity in the vulgar sense, they nonetheless could stigmatize the user as a member of a socially inferior class. Even favored euphemisms such as toilet eventually become stigmatized like the words they replace (the so-called euphemism treadmill), and currently favored words serve as a sort of "cultural capital".

== Vulgar humor ==
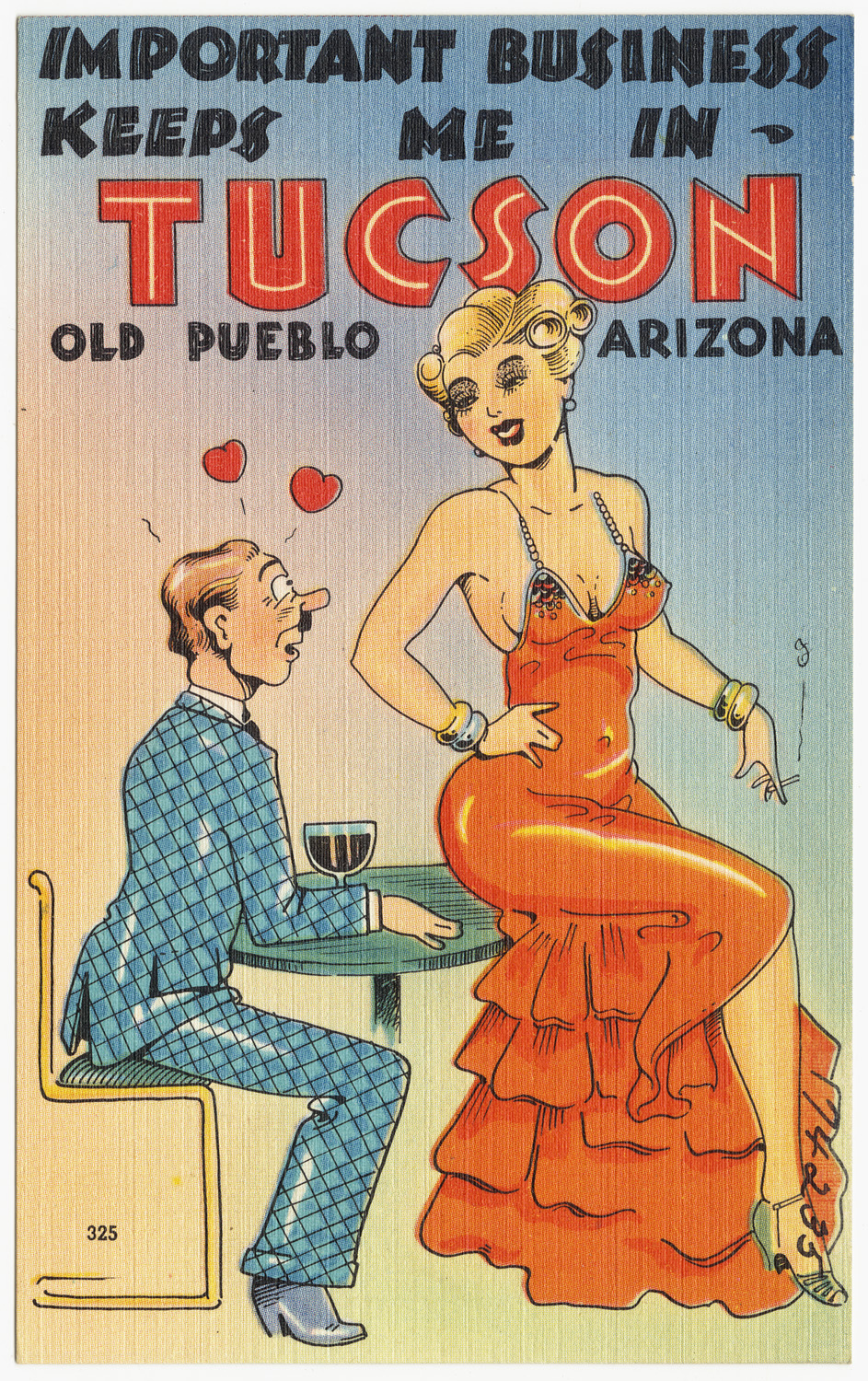
A postcard containing off-color humor

Off-color humor (also known as vulgar humor, crude humor, crass humor, coarse humor or shock humor) is humor that deals with topics that may be considered to be in poor taste or vulgar. Many comedic genres (including jokes, prose, poems, black comedy, blue comedy, insult comedy, cringe comedy and skits) may incorporate "off-color" elements.

Most commonly labeled as "off-color" are acts concerned with sex, a particular ethnic group, or gender. Other off-color topics include violence, particularly domestic abuse; excessive swearing or profanity; toilet humor; national superiority or inferiority, pedophilic content, and any topics generally considered impolite or indecent. Generally, the point of off-color humor is to induce laughter by evoking a feeling of shock and surprise in the comedian's audience. In this way, off-color humor is related to other forms of postmodern humor, such as the anti-joke.

== Language ==
Vulgarity, in the sense of vulgar speech, can refer to language which is offensive or obscene.

The word most associated with the verbal form of vulgarity is "cursing." However, there are many subsections of vulgar words. American psychologist Timothy Jay classifies "dirty words" because it "allows people interested in language to define the different types of reference or meaning that dirty words employ. One can see that what is considered taboo or obscene revolves around a few dimensions of human experience that there is a logic behind dirty word usage." One of the most commonly used vulgar terms in the English language is fuck.
