= The Ordeal of Richard Feverel (TV series) =

British television series

- Genre: Historical drama
- Based on: The Ordeal of Richard Feverel by George Meredith
- Written by: Rosemary Anne Sisson
- Directed by: Rex Tucker
- Starring: David Cargill; Hugh Burden; Anna Carteret
- Composer: Tristram Cary
- Country of origin: United Kingdom
- Original language: English
- No. of series: 1
- No. of episodes: 4

Production
- Producer: Douglas Allen
- Running time: 40 minutes
- Production company: BBC

Original release
- Network: BBC Two
- Release: 12 September – 3 October 1964

The Ordeal of Richard Feverel is a 1964 British historical drama television series, which originally aired on BBC 2 in four episodes from 12 September to 3 October 1964. It is an adaptation of the 1859 novel of the same title by George Meredith.

The only television adaptation produced, all four episodes are believed to still exist, although they are unavailable for public viewing.

== Cast ==
- David Cargill as Adrian Harley
- Barry Justice as Richard Feverel
- Hugh Burden as Sir Austin Feverel
- Betty Hardy as Mrs Bessy Berry
- Anna Carteret as Lucy Desborough
- Mary Kerridge as Mrs Doria Forey
- Barbara Lott as Lady Blandish
- Anne Castaldini as Clare Forey
- Adrian Ropes as Ripton Thompson
- Patrick Connor as Tom Bakewell
- Felix Felton as Hippias Feverel
- Alan Lawrance as Benson
- Annabel Barton as Mrs Mount
- David Langton as Lord Falcon
- Francis de Wolff as Farmer Blaize
- Peter Pratt as The Hon Peter Brayder
- Arthur Hewlett a Mr Thompson
- Nicholas Roylance as Richard Feverel (the boy)
- Howard Knight as Ripton Thompson (the boy)
- Elizabeth Benzimra as Clare Forey (the child)
- Rachel Clay as Lucy Desborough (the child)
- Christopher Denham as Curate
- Hazel Sutton as Mignonne
- Jonathan Cecil as Giles Jinkson
- Willoughby Gray as Sir Miles Papworth

== Bibliography ==
- Baskin, Ellen . Serials on British Television, 1950-1994. Scolar Press, 1996.
