= The Adventures of Harry Richmond =

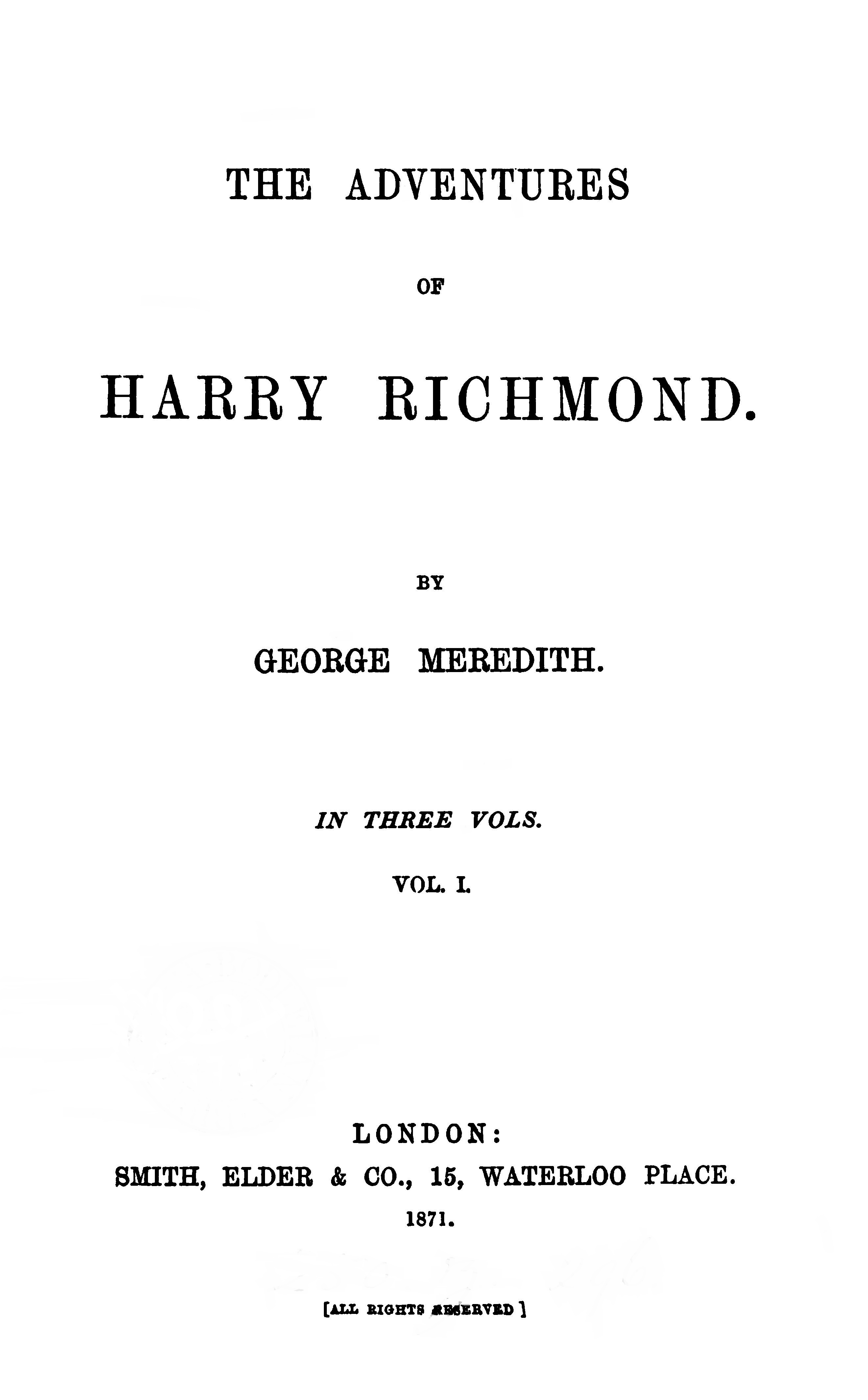
- First edition title page
- Author: George Meredith
- Language: English
- Genre: Romance novel, Picaresque novel, Adventure novel
- Publisher: Cornhill Magazine
- Publication date: 1870-71
- Publication place: United Kingdom
- Media type: Print (Magazine serial)

The Adventures of Harry Richmond (1870–71) is a romance by British author George Meredith, sometimes picaresque, sometimes melodramatic. It is believed to be strongly autobiographical in some sections. Meredith intended the book to be a popular success, but the roll-call of reprints shows it to have been so only during Meredith's late-Victorian and Edwardian heyday, his highly-wrought style proving an obstacle for some readers.

== Synopsis ==
At the beginning of the novel, Harry Richmond is a young boy, living under the care of his grandfather, Squire Beltham, in their home of Riversley, in Hampshire, England. The Squire, one of the wealthiest people in England, had two daughters, one of whom, Dorothy, still lives at Riversley. The other daughter married Roy Richmond, Harry's father, who drove the daughter permanently insane; she is also at Riversley. At the beginning of the book, Roy Richmond shows up at Riversley, and claiming parental rights, takes away Harry to be brought up by him. After some adventures in London, Harry is left in a boarding school by Roy, where he meets a number of friends who show up throughout the novel. While he is there his mother dies. Harry escapes from the school, and with help of the gypsy girl Kiomi, returns to Riversley. While there he misses his father, and overhearing that he may be in London, goes there with his friend Temple. Harry and Temple however end up falling asleep on a boat, the Priscilla, and are taken away against their will to Germany, where Harry rediscovers his father, and meets Princess Ottilia.

When Harry comes of age, he inherits a large sum and is told that he will receive 20,000/year if marries his third-cousin Janet Ilchester, of whom the Squire is very fond. Instead Harry, with the considerable help of his father, pursues the Princess, despite the objections of the Prince her father, and after a while, receives her promise to be married, after he becomes a member of Parliament, which eventually occurs.

Roy Richmond deceives the Princess into visiting Harry at "the Island" (probably the Isle of Wight), claiming that he is near death. In the climax of the novel, the Squire is supposed to request from the Prince, with expectation of an acceptance, the hand of the Princess. At this point all of the plans of Roy Richmond for his son Harry seem to have come to fruition. However, the Squire discovers that his daughter, Dorothy, has given 25,000 to Roy Richmond to cover his debts, and refuses to carry out the scheme. The plan collapses and the Princess marries a German Prince.

Harry Richmond realises that he loves Janet Ilchester, and after further adventures, they are finally married in Germany. After the marriage, they return to Riversley, only to find it engulfed in flames. In the fire Roy Richmond dies looking to the safety of Dorothy.

== Writing and publication history ==
Meredith first began working on The Adventures of Harry Richmond as far back as 1863, and the following year he told his friend Augustus Jessopp that he was writing a work to be called The Adventure of Richmond Roy and his Friend, Contrivance Jack: Being the History of Two Rising Men. Since he was also working on the novels Rhoda Fleming and Vittoria in these years progress was slow, but Harry Richmond was completed by 1870. It first appeared in Cornhill Magazine between September 1870 and November 1871, with illustrations by George du Maurier. The novel had been intended by Meredith as "a spanking bid for popularity", and at first the bid seemed successful. The magazine appearance was followed at the end of 1871 by a three-volume edition issued by Smith, Elder & Co., with a second edition only three months later. At that point the demand died away, and another edition was not needed for 15 years; but with the revival of interest in Meredith in the 1880s a string of reprints began, which lasted up to the First World War.

== Critical reception ==
As with many other of Meredith's novels, Harry Richmond has always divided critical opinion. From the start many were disconcerted by the spectacle of a studiedly witty and philosophical adventure story. An anonymous reviewer in The Examiner was damning:

Mr. Meredith sets at defiance all ordinary rules of composition, and indulges in the wildest vagaries of plot-making; but the net result of his efforts is a work so enigmatical, and with such constant affectation of wit, that it is very irksome reading, and so disappointing in the end that the reader who has plodded through the three volumes is likely to vow that he will never take up another of Mr. Meredith's novels.

W. L. Courtney, writing in the Fortnightly Review in 1886, complained:

Here is a young man who goes through a series of surprising adventures quite removed from the sphere of probability…The only literary excuse for such extravagance would be the rollicking character of the hero, such a one, for instance, as was endeared to our childhood by Captain Marryat or Kingston. But Harry Richmond does not rollick; he is never young, but talks about himself with the maladie de la pensée of a modern age.

On the other hand Arthur Symons found it "rousing, enthralling, exciting, full of poetry, and a serious and masterly study in character", and Max Beerbohm enthused: "What a book! What swiftness and beauty and strength! It is the flight of a young golden eagle high across seas and mountains." Gore Vidal claimed that Mark Twain enjoyed and "stole" the characters of the Duke and the Dauphin in Huckleberry Finn from Harry Richmond, and noted:

They knew that literature was (let us use the past tense) never a democracy or even a republic. It was a kingdom, and there for a time ruled George Meredith, the tailor's son whose unique art made him what all of Richmond Roy's con-man's cleverness could not, a king.

== Modern editions ==
- L. T. Hergenhan (ed.) The Adventures of Harry Richmond (Lincoln: University of Nebraska Press, 1970)
- Sven-Johan Spånberg (ed.) The Adventures of Harry Richmond: The Unpublished Parts (Uppsala: Almqvist and Wiksell, 1990)
