= Diana of the Crossways =

1885 novel by George Meredith

Diana of the Crossways is a novel by George Meredith which was published in 1885, based on the life of socialite and writer Caroline Norton.

== Background ==
Diana of the Crossways was first serialized in the Fortnightly in 1884, then published as a book the following year. The book was Meredith's first popular novel; at least three editions of Diana of the Crossways would come out in 1885, and for many years it remained Meredith's most popular work. The book's popularity has been attributed in part to the boost in recognition that 1879's The Egoist gave Meredith, but also its roots in a high society scandal.

Meredith based the titular character of Diana on socialite, poet and novelist Caroline Norton, with whom he was acquainted, and the politics of the story on the troubled history of Robert Peel's administration and the 1845 Corn Laws. Norton had been accused of selling to The Times the news, allegedly told to her by admirer Sidney Herbert, of Peel's intent to repeal the laws. The story was later proven false, but its prominence in Meredith's fictionalized story drew significant credence to the claim. Beginning with the 1890 edition, Meredith added a disclaimer to the preface of the book that "the story of Diana of the Crossways is to be read as fiction."

Diana of the Crossways has been described as a feminist novel, and contemporary writers have drawn additional parallels between Diana's marriage and Meredith's similarly troubled marriage to his first wife Mary Ellen, the dissolution of which had deeply troubled him for several decades. Critic Richard Cronin argues that Meredith's choice to make Diana childless – unlike Norton, whose political activism over losing custody of her sons famously led Parliament to pass several reforms concerning married women's rights – stemmed from a desire to "avoid reflecting on the similarities between [George Norton's behavior] and his own behavior toward Mary Ellen."

== Plot ==
Diana Warwick, beautiful, charming and intelligent but hotheaded, becomes embroiled in a political as well as a social scandal. She says: "We women are the verbs passive of the alliance, we have to learn, and if we take to activity, with the best intentions, we conjugate a frightful disturbance. We are to run on lines, like the steam-trains, or we come to no station, dash to fragments. I have the misfortune to know I was born an active. I take my chance." Her efforts to advance her husband, through cultivating a friendship with Cabinet Minister Lord Dannisburgh, lead to scandal and alienation from her husband, Augustus Warwick. Her intention to live "independently" through writing is initially successful, but her involvement in politics brings her to grief, both personal and public.

== Characters ==
- Diana Merion, the fiery title character. She enters into a loveless marriage with Augustus Warwick. She was heavily inspired by Caroline Norton
- Dan Merion, the father of Diana. A noted wit, his relation to Diana parallels that of Caroline Norton's grandfather, Richard Brinsley Sheridan.
- Augustus Warwick, a politician who marries Diana, but later attempts to divorce her due to her platonic friendship with Lord Dannisburgh.
- Lord Dannisburgh, an elderly cabinet minister who befriends Diana
- Percy Dacier, the nephew of Lord Dannisburgh. He is infatuated with Diana, but is betrayed when she leaks information about him to the newspapers.
- Marcus Tonans, a newspaper editor
- Constance Asper, a wealthy and well-regarded heiress. She ultimately marries Percy Dacier
- Captain Rampan, a womaniser who pursues unmarried women. He forms part of the reason why Diana is forced to marry Augustus Warwick.
- Mary Paynham, a portrait-painter with a damaged reputation
- Mrs Crambourne Wathin, the wife of a tradesman whose social ambition leads her to insult Diana Meredith's character
- Thomas Redworth, the faithful lover of Diana Meredith who remains alongside her throughout her marriage to Augustus Warwick. After Warwick's death, he marries Diana.
- Arthur Rhodes, a failed writer who unsuccessfully proposes to Diana.

== Adaptation ==
In 1922 the novel was adapted into a film Diana of the Crossways directed by Denison Clift and starring Fay Compton and Henry Victor.

== See also ==
- Caroline Norton
- History of feminism
