= Modern Love (poetry collection) =

1862 poetry collection by George Meredith

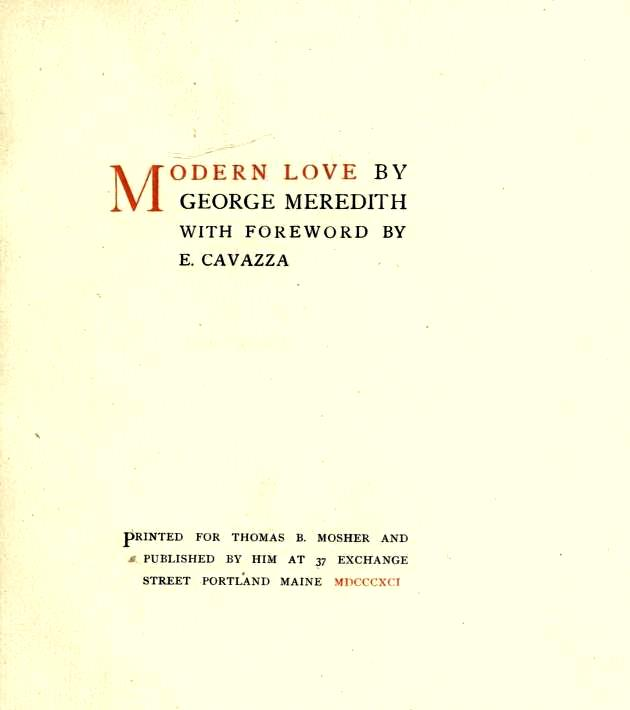
- Thomas Bird Mosher's American bibliographical edition of 1891
- Author: George Meredith
- Language: English
- Genre: Sonnet sequence
- Publisher: Chapman & Hall
- Publication date: 1862
- Publication place: England
- Media type: Print
- Text: Modern Love at Wikisource

Modern Love by George Meredith is a sequence of fifty 16-line sonnets about the failure of a marriage, an episodic verse narrative that has been described as "a novella in verse". Earlier working titles for the sequence were "The Love-Match" and then "The Tragedy of Modern Love". It first appeared in 1862 as part of the volume Modern Love and Poems of the English Roadside, published by Chapman & Hall, and then thirty years later, with slight modifications, from Macmillan.

== Context ==
Modern Love reflects in part Meredith's own disillusionment after his wife Mary Ellen, the widowed daughter of Thomas Love Peacock, left him for the painter Henry Wallis and had a child by him. The poem was not written until after her death in 1861, however, and cannot be regarded as autobiographical. Though it may depend emotionally on past feelings, details in the story-line differ in many respects from the biographical experience of both Meredith and his wife. In the poem the couple realise that their marriage is not working but jointly make a social pretence that suggests otherwise. Afterwards, and separately, they become sexually involved outside the marriage but eventually come together again. When this effort to repair the relationship fails, the wife poisons herself.

Meredith described his work to a correspondent as "a dissection of the sentimental passion of these days". It appeared in the context of other large-scale Victorian depictions of contemporary relationships, such as Elizabeth Barrett Browning's Aurora Leigh (1856) and Coventry Patmore's The Angel in the House (1854/1862). In his 1891 bibliographical reprint of Meredith's poem, however, what seemed significant to Thomas Bird Mosher was that it had followed shortly after mediaevalising works like William Morris's The Defence of Guinevere (1858), Algernon Charles Swinburne's verse dramas The Queen-Mother and Rosamond (1860) and Dante Gabriel Rossetti's translations of The Early Italian Poets (1861). But Meredith seems to occupy a middle ground, for while his story of the failing marriage is set in the present day, his poetic form, his frequent archaisms, the ironical address with which he ends sonnet 30 – "Lady, this is my Sonnet to your eyes" – all call to mind the Elizabethan amatory sequence. And this, in the eyes of one female critic, is evidence of the masterly way in which Meredith matches form to content throughout the poem "by a recurrent opposition of sincerity to artifice".

In form, each 'sonnet' comprises four sets of internally rhyming quatrains, where the final quatrain either sums up the poem's drift or else serves as a turning point that takes the meaning in a new direction. In this way it corresponds roughly to the final couplet of the conventional Shakespearian sonnet. It was suggested to Meredith at the time that the form was modelled on the Italian caudate sonnet and, although he was dismissive of this attempt to find an orthodox ancestry for his work, the possibility continues to be discussed. Rather than continuity, the poet's theme is disruption within the marriage and this is further mirrored in disruption of the normal iambic pentameter within lines, especially by breaking up the narrative with frequent caesuras and enjambing the sense over lines.

Often ambiguous in any case, the meaning is made harder to follow because of the confusion over whether it is the voice of the narrator or the husband's inner dialogue we are hearing. A further level of ambiguity occurs in the different linguistic registers of wording, often in close proximity to each other, which make the author's intention unclear. In the third quatrain of sonnet 50, for example, the archaic word 'dole' in the line "Deep questioning, which probes to endless dole," is followed immediately by the alliterating colloquialism of "Ah, what a dusty answer gets the soul": a prosaic response to the poetic. In similar fashion, the "tragic hints" thundering oceanically in the final stanza leave no more than a "faint thin line upon the shore".

== Themes ==
The sequence is an early example of mid-Victorian questioning of the values of its time, in this case by examining the interpersonal tensions of a loveless marriage from which the partners cannot escape because of the contemporary legal restrictions on divorce. As a novelist, Meredith had already used the failure of his own marriage as material for The Ordeal of Richard Feverel (1859). In his poetical treatment of the subject, with its ironical echoes of older works of the "and they lived happily ever after" kind, his focus is upon the mismatch between the idealised expectations of marriage founded on such literature and having to dissimulate disappointment in them in order to meet societal conventions.

An objective consideration of the place and rights of women is hindered, since the narration is all from the husband's side in the sequence. The ambiguity of distinguishing between the narrator's voice there and the sexist attitudes exhibited by the husband contributes to this. In an article in the Victorian Newsletter, Hans Ostrom points out the way in which the husband "has fallen back on the most mechanically formulaic way of perceiving the troubled marriage; the problem. . . no longer exists in the marriage, but rather in the wife's femininity, in the fact that she is acting "like a woman". Double standards apply when women seek the same solace as have men in the past outside the marriage.

The husband has to face this when, in sonnet 7, he sees his wife as the attractive woman that others may find her through an imaginative reconstruction of his own mental habits, yet falls back on the demand on her, not simply for social prudence in behaviour but for emotional faithfulness to himself in addition. The irony of Meredith's title points to the fact that "modern love" is of this different and more demanding kind after the decay of the old attitude of male matrimonial complaisance. Beyond marriage as the arrangement of a social contract connected with wealth and position, emotional fidelity is a new and impossible requirement. Modern love, in this new context, is a hypocritical keeping up of appearances in the face of Darwinian pressures to act otherwise:

Then if we study nature we are wise.
Thus do the few who live but with the day.
The scientific animals are they. [Sonnet 30]

Meredith is examining what is essentially an insoluble problem and by the end of the sequence comes to no certain conclusion.

== Bibliography ==
- Hemberger, Anna. “Change is in the Air-But Can the Victorians Smell It?: Meredith's Modern Love as a Telling Aroma”, Victorian Web
- Holmes, John. "Darwinism, Feminism, and the Sonnet Sequence: Meredith's Modern Love", Victorian Poetry 48. 4, (Winter 2010), West Virginia University Press
- Mermin, Dorothy M. "Poetry as Fiction: Meredith's Modern Love”, ELH 43.1, (Spring, 1976), The Johns Hopkins University Press
- Moore, Natasha. "Finding a Form for Modern Love: The Marriage of Form and Content in George Meredith's Modern Love', University of Sydney 2014
- Ostrom, Hans. "The Disappearance of Tragedy in Meredith's Modern Love. Victorian Newsletter 63 (Spring 1983): 26-30.
