= Feverel =

Feverel is a surname. Fictional characters with this surname inlulde:

- Richard and Lucy Feverel in The Ordeal of Richard Feverel
- Violet Feverel in Murder on a Bridle Path
