= Evan Harrington =

1861 novel by George Meredith

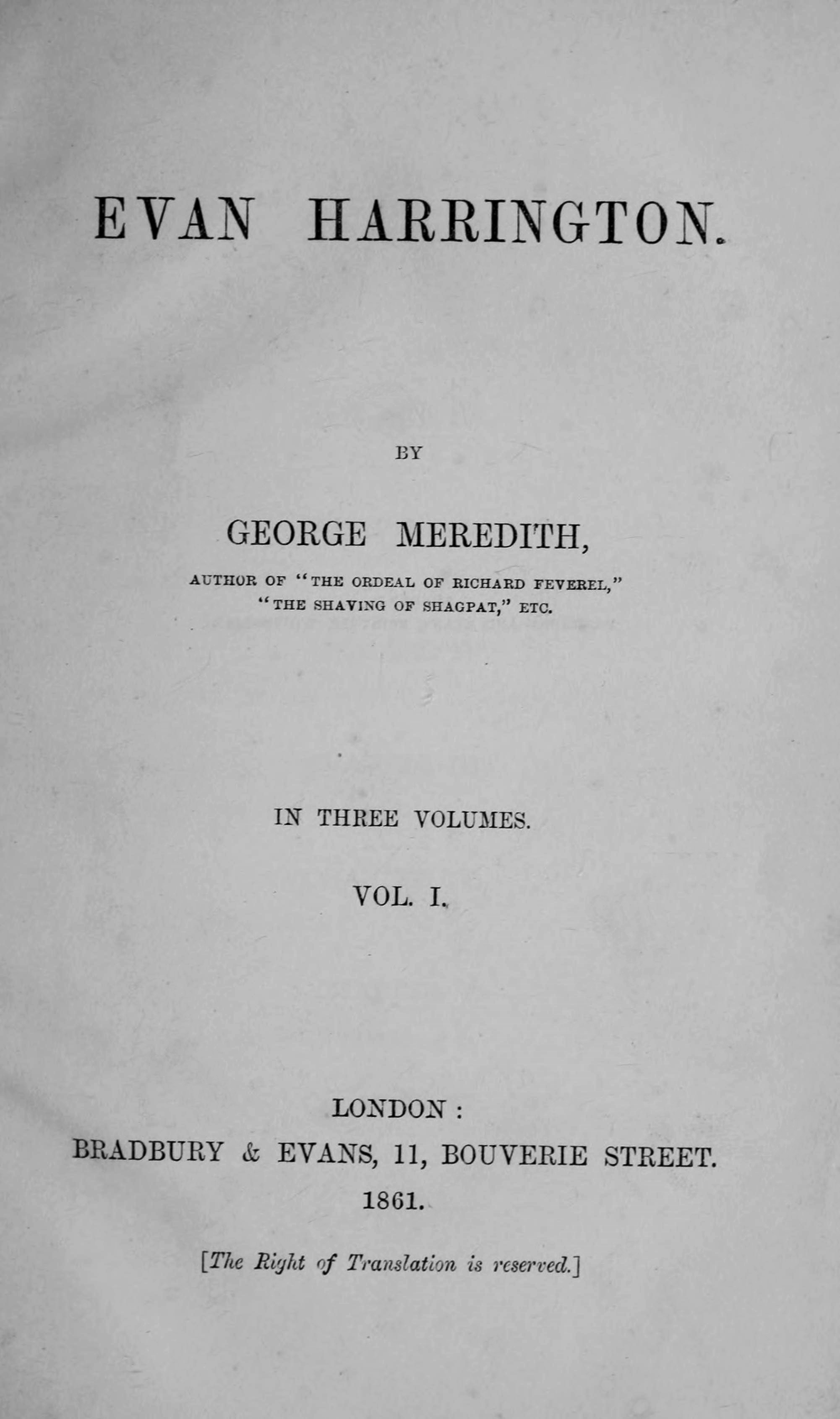
First edition title page

Evan Harrington is an 1861 novel by George Meredith, a glowing comedy of Victorian presumptions.

== Setting and plot ==
The second of Meredith's 'mainstream' novels, the work is loosely autobiographical in inspiration; and concerns the social climbing family (three married daughters; one unmarried son) of the recently deceased tailor, Melchisedec (The Great Mel) Harrington.

== Characters ==
Two of Meredith's most notable comic creations - The Great Mel and his daughter Louisa, the scheming Countess of Saldar - appear in the book. Among lesser comic figures are Jack Raikes and Mr Parsley.

The love interest of the hero, Evan - who is urged up the social ladder by his three sisters - is Rose Jocelyn: she was taken as the epitome of mid-Victorian womanhood by the scholar Henry Sidgwick.

== See also ==
- Lady Anna
