= The Shaving of Shagpat =

1856 novel by George Meredith

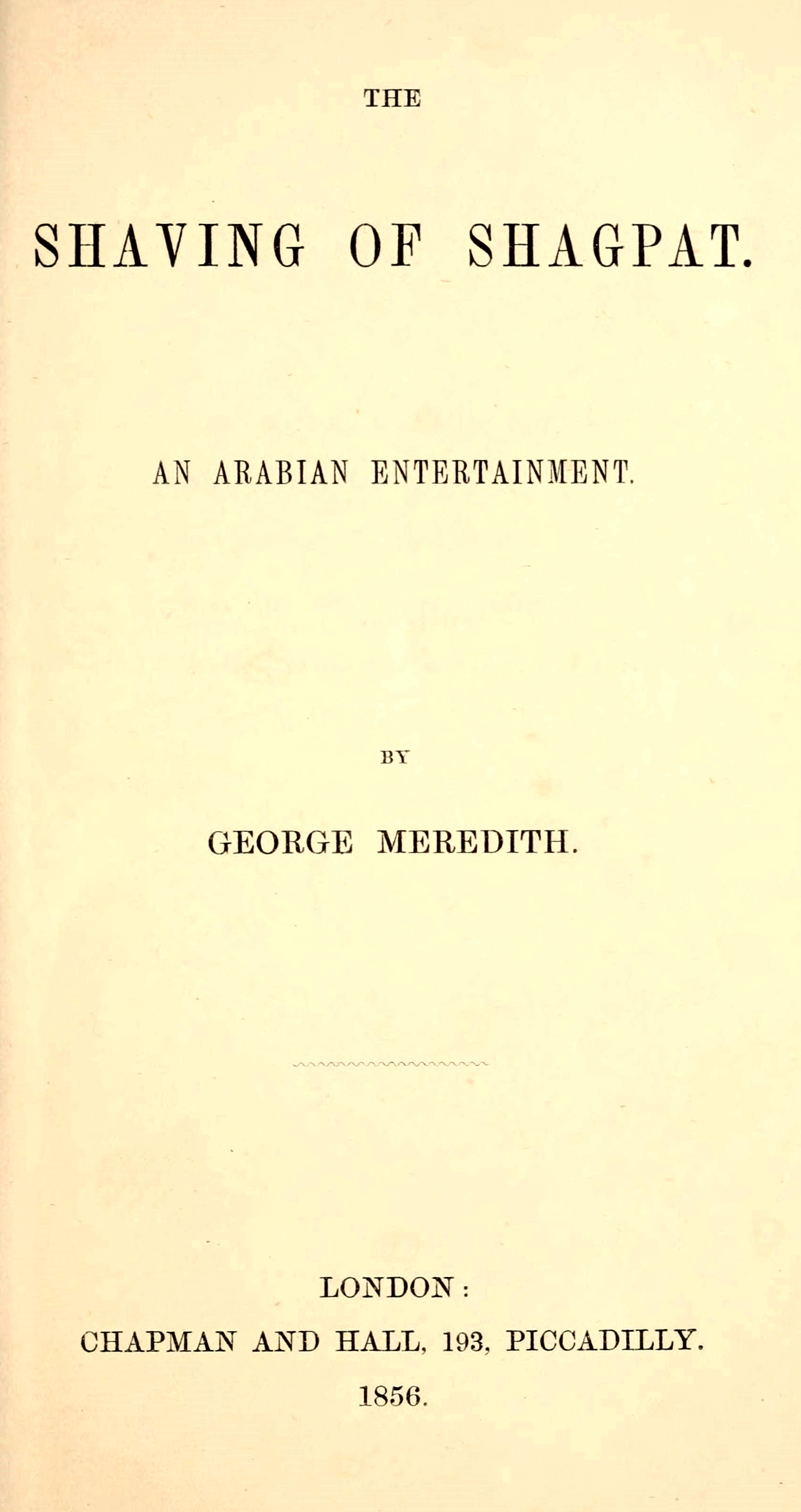
- First edition title page
- Author: George Meredith
- Language: English
- Genre: Fantasy
- Publisher: Chapman and Hall
- Publication date: 1856
- Publication place: United Kingdom
- Media type: Print (Hardcover)
- Pages: viii, 384
- Text: The Shaving of Shagpat at Wikisource

The Shaving of Shagpat: An Arabian Entertainment is a fantasy novel by English writer George Meredith. It was first published in hardcover by Chapman and Hall in 1856, and there have been numerous editions since. Its importance in the history of fantasy literature was recognized by its reissuing by Ballantine Books as the seventeenth volume of the Ballantine Adult Fantasy series in July 1970. The Ballantine edition includes an introduction by Lin Carter.

The novel is a humorous oriental romance and allegory written in the style of the Arabian Nights. Like its model, it includes a number of stories within the story, along with poetic asides.

== Plot summary ==
Shibli Bagarag, a Persian barber, and Noorna, an enchantress, are given the quest of shaving the tyrant Shagpat, who by the power of his magical hair holds his city in thrall. Along the way Shibli acquires a magic sword and meets a series of exotic creatures, including a talking hawk and several genies.

The second paragraph of the book provides a capsule summary of the story: "Now the story of Shibli Bagarag, and of the ball he followed, and of the subterranean kingdom he came to, and of the enchanted palace he entered, and of the sleeping king he shaved, and of the two princesses he released, and of the Afrite held in subjection by the arts of one and bottled by her, is it not known as 'twere written on the finger-nails of men and traced in their corner robes?"

== Reception ==
Everett F. Bleiler described The Shaving of Shagpat as "a very curious work, at times written with great imagination of small incident and richness of fantasy". He noted that the novel was anomalous in the context of Meredith's work overall, and that it has been said to have allegorical elements relating to the politics of its day (although Meredith denied the claim in later editions).

George Eliot praised the novel as "'a work of genius', precious 'as an apple tree among the trees of the wood'". She went on to say that Meredith's fantasy "has none of the tameness which belongs to mere imitations manufactured with servile effort or thrown off with simious facility. It is no patchwork of borrowed incidents. Mr. Meredith has not simply imitated Arabian fictions, he has been inspired by them; he has used oriental forms, but only as an oriental genius would have used them".

Despite positive reviews, The Shaving of Shagpat sold poorly and the 1st edition wound up in the remainder stalls. Meredith never attempted fantasy again, but became a successful writer of modern romantic novels.
