= Thomas of Monmouth =

Welsh Benedictine monk and writer

- Born: twelfth century Monmouth, Wales
- Died: after 1172; Norwich, England
- Occupations: monk, writer
- Known for: The Life and Passion of William of Norwich

Thomas of Monmouth (fl. 1149–c.1173) was a Benedictine monk who lived in the Priory at Norwich Cathedral, England during the mid-twelfth century. He was the author of The Life and Miracles of St William of Norwich, a hagiography of William of Norwich that is considered the earliest example of the ritual murder libel.

== Career ==
Thomas of Monmouth's only known work is the Vita et Passione Sancti Willelmi Martyris Norwicensis, as it is described in the only extant manuscript, Cambridge University Library MS. Add. 3037. It has been edited and translated by Augustus Jessop and M. R. James as The Life and Miracles of William of Norwich and by Miri Rubin as The Life and Passion of William of Norwich. In this book, Thomas of Monmouth falsely claims that a boy, William, who has been found dead in the forest, was in fact murdered by Jews in a re-enactment of the crucifixion, and that he therefore is a saint.

== Life of William ==
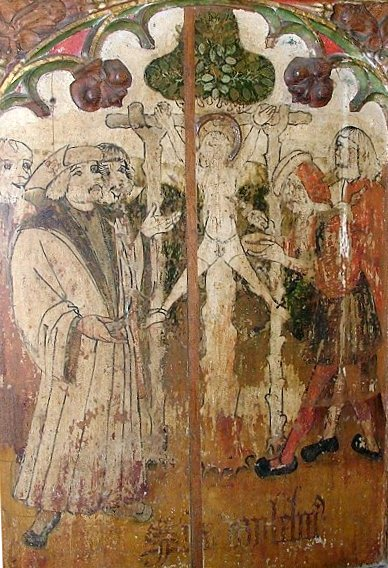
The crucifixion of William as described by Thomas, depicted on a rood screen in Holy Trinity church, Loddon, Norfolk

This is the earliest textual record of an accusation of ritual murder against the Jews. In a seminal article, Gavin Langmuir argued that Thomas of Monmouth himself had made the whole thing up. Subsequent historians have suggested instead that Thomas heard and elaborated on rumors that were already circulating or that the accusation was created as a fake cover story for the murder by a knight called Simon of Novers of a Jew called Eleazar, to whom Simon was in debt. Whatever the case, Thomas's book has had a lasting and pernicious impact.

The single surviving manuscript of Thomas' work was discovered by M. R. James and published in 1896 with historical essays by James and Augustus Jessopp.

== Works ==
- Thomas of Monmouth. (1172), Jessopp, Augustus; James, M. R. (eds.), The Life and Miracles of St William of Norwich (in Latin and English) (1896 ed.), Cambridge: Cambridge University Press, OL 7250037M
- Thomas of Monmouth, The Life and Passion of William of Norwich. Trans. Miri Rubin (London: Penguin Classics, 2014)
