= The House on the Beach =

Novel by George Meredith

The House on the Beach: A Realistic Tale is a novella by English novelist George Meredith. It first appeared in print in 1877.

== Plot ==
A young woman is forced by conscience to become inappropriately engaged to a far older man, who threatens to reveal the secret that her father was previously a deserter.

== Background ==
Although the novella wasn't written until the late 1870s, Meredith had started the story 15 years prior in Seaford. He appears to have been inspired to take up the story again after the 1876 Great Flood at Seaford, which forms the novella's dramatic denouement.

The House on the Beach was first published in New Quarterly magazine in January 1877, a magazine in which Meredith also published The Case of General Ople and Lady Camper and The Tale of Chloe, novellas often classified and published with The House on the Beach.

== Literary criticism ==
In assessing Meredith's approach to the comedic, the character of Tinman dressing himself in his court dress for his own admiration is an example of "when the control of reason is removed".
