= The Life and Miracles of St William of Norwich =

Hagiography of a Benedictine monk

The Life and Miracles of St William of Norwich (Latin: Vita et Passione Sancti Willelmi Martyris Norwicensis) is a Latin hagiography of William of Norwich by the Benedictine monk Thomas of Monmouth that was written in the second half of the twelfth century. It puts forth the claim that a young boy named William, who had been found dead in a forest, was in fact ritually murdered by Jews, and was therefore eligible for sainthood.

The book was composed some years after the accusations of murder and local veneration of William of Norwich as a saint.

The Benedictine order was particularly motivated to found new shrines, for reasons of monetary and spiritual power, but especially important for Norwich's monks, as they lacked a patron saint.

Interest in the document lies partly in the fact that it details the first complete account of the myth of ritual murder by Jews. Such accounts of Blood libels were later made widely elsewhere in England, and were utilised to motivate violence against Jews across Europe in the centuries following. Scholars have also found value in using the document to understand the mental depiction of the world and its cultural values of the period.

Thomas of Monmouth's account contributed to the Jewish community in England experiencing intense discrimination and eventually expulsion. The 1194 Ordinances placed new taxes and restrictions upon the Jews. By 1290, Edward I expelled all Jews from England.

The single surviving manuscript of Thomas' work was discovered by M. R. James and published in 1896 with historical essays by James and Augustus Jessopp. It had survived in the small village of Brent Eleigh, Suffolk.

== Overview ==
The first two books of The Life and Miracles of William of Norwich contain Thomas of Monmouth's version of the story of William's life and murder, the remaining five books contain descriptions of a series of purported miracles ascribed to William after his death, which constitute Thomas' claim for William's sanctity. The miracles that are recounted include a rose flower growing on the grave in winter through the snow and cold, and healings taking place.

The account of the murder of William is understood by modern scholars to be essentially fictional and motivated to support the development of a cult of sainthood. William is therefore portrayed in an exceedingly flattering light, while the account of his murder is lurid. Thus, according to the book, William was a 12-year old "boy of unusual innocence." It claims that initially, William had many Jewish friends and was very well-liked, but he was abducted by other Jews. The book then describes him as being bound and gagged by an object called a teasel, then shaven and forced to wear a crown of thorns.

The book claims that afterwards William was "fixed to a cross in mockery of the Lord's Passion" and crucified. Like many other martyrologists and hagiographers of the medieval era, Thomas of Monmouth deliberately constructed William's murder to mimic the death of Crucifixion of Jesus Christ, comparing William to "an innocent lamb" in order to show his murderers as being motivated in odium fidei ("out of hatred of the faith").

Writing in 1938, Jacob R. Marcus commented on the legacy of William of Norwich and other alleged cases like his: "Generations have believed that no Christian child was safe in Jewish hands. Hundreds of Jews have been imprisoned, killed, or burned alive on this charge. The Papacy has frequently denounced this charge, yet it is equally true that in numerous instances the accusation of ritual murder was not made except with the vigorous support of local Church authorities. The author, Thomas of Monmouth, a monk in the Norwich Benedictine monastery, was an exceptionally credulous person. Jessop, one of the editors of Thomas's work, believes that our monkish author belongs to the class of those who are 'deceivers and being deceived'. In the specific case of William of Norwich, the evidence, critically sifted, leads one to believe that he actually existed and that his body was found after he had died a violent death. Everything beyond this, however, is in the realm of speculation."

== See also ==
- Blood Libel

== Bibliography ==
- Thomas of Monmouth, The Life and Passion of William of Norwich Trans. Miri Rubin (London: Penguin Classics, 2014)
- Thomas of Monmouth (1896). Jessopp, Augustus; James, Montague Rhodes (eds.). The Life and Miracles of William of Norwich. Cambridge University Press. ISBN 978-1-108-03976-5.
- Thomas of Monmouth; Obenauf, Sarah Edwards (2020). "The Life and Passion of William of Norwich (1152–70)". In McNabb, Cameron Hunt (ed.). Medieval Disability Sourcebook: Western Europe. Punctum Books. pp. 173–80. doi:10.2307/j.ctv11hptcd.16.
- Jacob R. Marcus (1938), The Jew in the Medieval World, Union of American Hebrew Congregations.
- Langmuir, Gavin (1984). ""Thomas of Monmouth: Detector of Ritual Murder"". Speculum. 59 (4): 820–846. doi:10.2307/2846698. JSTOR 2846698. S2CID 162522804.
- McCulloh, John M. "Jewish Ritual Murder: William of Norwich, Thomas of Monmouth, and the Early Dissemination of the Myth," Speculum 72, no. 3 (1997): 698–740.
- Cohen, Jeffrey Jerome. "The Flow of Blood in Medieval Norwich." Speculum 79, no. 1 (2004): 26–65.
- Hillaby, Joe; Hillaby, Caroline (2013). The Palgrave Dictionary of Medieval Anglo-Jewish History. Basingstoke: Palgrave Macmillan. pp. 324–5. ISBN 978-0230278165.
- Yarrow, Simon. Saints and Their Communities: Miracle Stories in Twelfth-Century England. Oxford: Clarendon Press, 2006.
- Rose, E. M., The Murder of William of Norwich: the Origins of the Blood Libel in Medieval Europe. Oxford: Oxford University Press, 2015
- Blurton, Heather, Inventing William of Norwich: Thomas of Monmouth, Antisemitism and Literary Culture, 1150 - 1200. Philadelphia: University of Pennsylvania Press, 2022.
