= The Tale of Chloe =

1879 novel by George Meredith

The Tale of Chloe: An Episode in the History of Beau Beamish
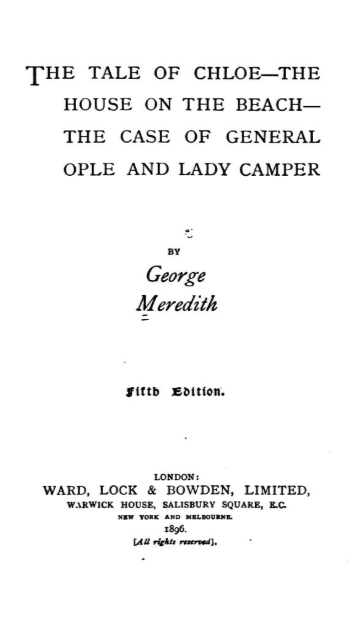
- Author: George Meredith
- Language: English
- Published: 1879 (New Quarterly Magazine); 1890 (J. W. Lovell company)
- Pages: 144
- OCLC: 2349325
- LC Class: PZ3.M54 T PR5006.T3

The Tale of Chloe, subtitled An Episode in the History of Beau Beamish, is a tragic novel by English novelist George Meredith. Initially published in 1879, it was later published as a novel in 1890.

== Characters ==
Chloe's (Catherine Martinsward) character was based on Miss Fanny Braddock, the sister of General Braddock, a soldier and commander in the French and Indian War. Her character follows the convention of Meredith's heroines, women whose rash decisions make 'personal disaster', that requires the strength of heart each one owns to carry them through.

Mr Camwell is a devotee of Chloe's.

Sir Martin Caseldy, a former beau of Chloe's.

Susan, Duchess of Dewlap, a former dairymaid married to an elderly duke.

Mr Beau Beamish, a friend of Chloe's.

== Plot ==
Catherine Martinsward ('Chloe') sacrifices her fortune to save her lover, Caseldy, from prison, but he then deserts her. Years later, he seduces Duchess Susan. Chloe grows close to the younger woman, and seeks to save her from a ruinous elopement. She ultimately commits suicide by Susan's doorway.

== Themes ==
Consistent with Meredith's other work of this period, The Tale of Chloe supports the rights and respect of women. Ives claims that The Tale of Chloe, The Case of General Ople and Lady Camper and The House on the Beach 'occupy both a chronological and thematic transition period between the early and late novels, during which [Meredith's] feminism intensified.'

== Background ==
The novel was first published in the New Quarterly Magazine in July 1879, after which it was published 10 more times in Meredith's lifetime. It is categorised together with The House on the Beach and The Case of General Ople and Lady Camper, all being short novels of the late 1870s. Its date of composition is debated; Beer places it in 1868–9.

A main source for the novel is Oliver Goldsmith's The Life of Richard Nash, first highlighted by an anonymous writer in the Saturday Westminster Gazette. Meredith claimed that, although he had read the Goldsmith in his youth, any influence on Chloe was 'unconscious', perhaps because of previous accusations that he had not acknowledged sources adequately.
