= Beauchamp's Career =

1876 novel by George Meredith

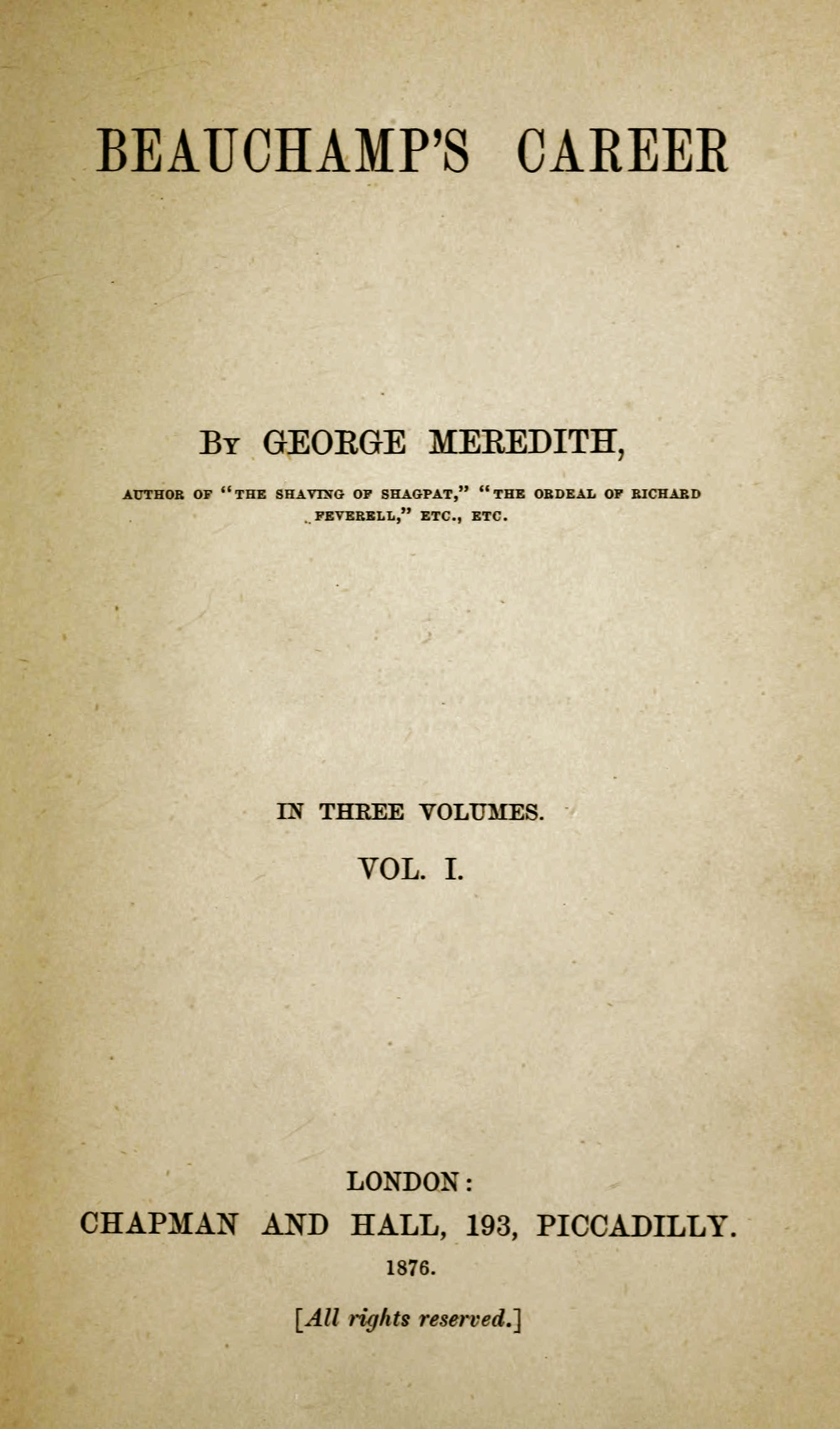
- First edition title page
- Author: George Meredith
- Language: English
- Genre: Political novel
- Publisher: Chapman & Hall
- Publication date: 1876
- Publication place: United Kingdom
- Media type: Print (Hardback)
- Pages: 969 pp

Beauchamp's Career is an 1876 novel by George Meredith which portrays life and love in upper-class Radical circles and satirises the Conservative establishment. Meredith himself thought it his best novel, and the character Renée de Croisnel was his favourite of his creations. The Penguin Companion to Literature calls it "One of the finest political novels in English."

== Synopsis ==
Nevil Beauchamp is a young naval officer with high ideals of honour and public service who, having been wounded in the Crimean War, recovers his health in Venice. He there falls in love with a brilliant and high-spirited French girl, Renée de Croisnel, with whom he hopes to elope. Renée marries an elderly French aristocrat instead, and Nevil takes up his naval career again. He falls under the influence of the republican and freethinking Dr. Shrapnel, thereby alienating his wealthy uncle Everard Romfrey, a staunchly Conservative peer. Nevil stands for Parliament as a Radical, but he is defeated. Everard horsewhips Dr. Shrapnel, and refuses when an outraged Nevil demands that he apologise. Renée now returns to claim Nevil, but he has meanwhile fallen in love with a beautiful Tory, Cecilia Halkett. Nevil reconciles Renée with her husband, but Cecilia refuses Nevil's proposal. With his love life in ruins Nevil falls ill and is thought to be at death's door. Uncle Everard repents of his quarrel with Nevil and Dr. Shrapnel, and apologises at last. On Nevil's recovery he marries Dr. Shrapnel's ward Jenny. The marriage is a happy one, in spite of Nevil's not being in love with her, but after a few months Nevil dies in an attempt to save a child from drowning.

== Publication history ==
Meredith began work on Beauchamp's Career in 1871, and completed it in the spring of 1874. He submitted it to The Cornhill Magazine, which rejected it, and then to The Fortnightly Review, which agreed to run it in a heavily condensed form. The Fortnightly serialized it between August 1874 and December 1875. Chapman & Hall published Beauchamp's Career in 3 volumes at the end of 1875, though on the imprint the date was given as 1876. Oxford University Press published it in their World's Classics series in 1950 with an introduction by G. M. Young, and again in 1988 edited by Margaret Harris.

== Critical reception ==
Reviews of the novel were generally appreciative, while claiming that for many reasons it was unlikely to be a popular success. The poet James Thomson, writing in The Secularist, complained ironically:

As if he were not sufficiently offensive in being original, he dares to be wayward and wilful, not theatrically or overweeningly like Charles Reade, but freakishly and humoristically, to the open-eyed disgust of our prim public.

The Times said that Meredith did not have

the knack of stooping to the tastes of his readers…His books are over-charged with brilliancy of thought, and overdone with epigram and sarcasm and dry shrewd humour. It is often very difficult to follow his meaning in the coruscations of his roving fancy...He not only writes high over the head of the average reader, but he credits him with his own quickness of apprehension.

The Athenaeum noted that "he is anti-sensational to the last degree"; while according to The Examiner

Mr. Meredith has an unpleasant way of suggesting that society at present exists under somewhat imperfect conditions, and that for these imperfect conditions the individual is largely responsible, because of his apathy and selfishness. It is, therefore, perhaps, scarcely to be wondered at that the bulk of novel readers, who only read to be amused, or to "kill time", as the phrase is, should be evilly disposed towards this brilliant writer who takes a keen pleasure in wielding his rapier, and hitting society deftly under the fifth rib.
