= Augustus Jessopp =

English cleric and writer

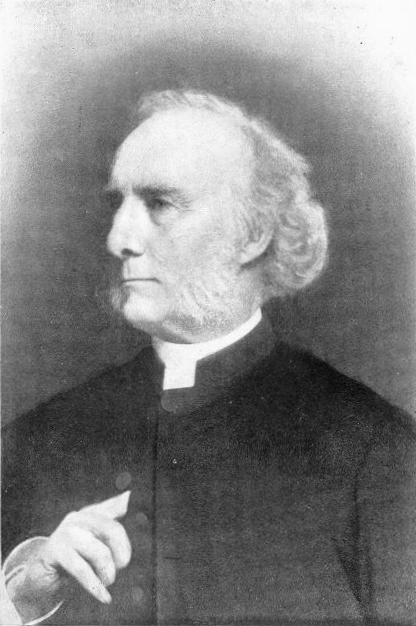
- Born: Augustus Jessopp; 20 December 1823; Cheshunt, Hertfordshire, England
- Died: 12 February 1914 (aged 90); Windsor, Berkshire, England
- Resting place: Scarning, Norfolk, England
- Education: Doctor of Divinity
- Alma mater: Cambridge, Oxford
- Occupations: Writer; clergyman
- Spouse: Mary Anne Margaret Cotesworth
- Writing career
- Subjects: Humorous, polemical, historical
- Notable works: Random Roaming, The Coming of the Friars, Arcady for Better or Worse, The Trials of a Country Parson, An Antiquary's Ghost Story

Augustus Jessopp (20 December 1823 – 12 February 1914) was an English cleric and writer. He spent periods of time as a schoolmaster and then later as a clergyman in Norfolk, England. He wrote regular articles for The Nineteenth Century, variously on humorous, polemical and historical topics. He published scholarly work on local Norfolk history and on aspects of English literature. A good friend of the academic and ghost-story writer M. R. James, he is described by James' biographer R. W. Pfaff as "a fine specimen of the learned but somewhat eccentric country parson."

== Early life ==
Born in Cheshunt, Hertfordshire, on 20 December 1823, he was the son of John Sympson Jessopp (c.1780–1851), barrister-at-law, and his wife Eliza Bridger Goodrich. He was educated at St John's College, Cambridge (B.A. 1848 and M.A. 1851). He took orders in 1848, and in the same year he married Mary Anne Margaret Cotesworth.

Jessopp took on the curacy of Papworth, Cambridgeshire, where he resided till 1854, when he became headmaster of Helston Grammar School. Here he remained until 1859, when he succeeded Dr Vincent at Norwich School, being thus brought into relations with East Anglia, the region he came to write about. His tenure at Norwich (where George Meredith's elder son was among his pupils) was uneventful, and from the fact that he seldom, if ever, alludes to schoolmastering in his subsequent writing, it may not have been to his taste. He began work on his historic studies while at Norwich, and became rector of Scarning in Norfolk in 1879. During this period, he was awarded a Bachelor and Doctor of Divinity (1870), from Worcester College, Oxford.

== Journalism for The Nineteenth Century ==
The Nineteenth Century was under the direction of James Knowles, and Jessopp's success may be due to this circumstance. His work certainly was what the editor wanted, and he wrote well, in a forcible, colloquial style, with earnestness, full of knowledge of his subjects, and helped by boisterous illustrations. Joseph Arch loomed large in the public eye; people wanted to hear what a county parson had to say about the agricultural labourer. He was firmly convinced that things were not going well in the rural parishes, and he was righteously indignant at the condition of the labourer's cottage, and the growing tendency to deprive him of all chance of rising to a higher level, an evil aggravated by the abolition of small farms. He realised also, the dullness of village life, the grinding monotony, and the impossibility of escape, though perhaps he was too prone to assume that these burdens would be as heavy to his neighbours as to himself.

Jessopp was essentially a man of the study, and the "monsters of life's waste" he attacked were too often those he imagined must be the bane of his poorer neighbours—rather than those that really oppressed them. Again, he was not Norfolk born. He never comprehended the inner nature of the hard-grained East Anglians that rates stranger and foe as nearly equivalent. For those reasons, he came to cross purposes with his people. He lost his temper sometimes and wrote about his neighbours in terms some of them resented. Numbers of The Nineteenth Century travelled down to Scarning; and when local celebrities recognised their portraits, dancing with stage antics to amuse the rector's town friends, and understood he was getting paid handsomely for the show, the feud waxed bitter.

== Historical writings ==
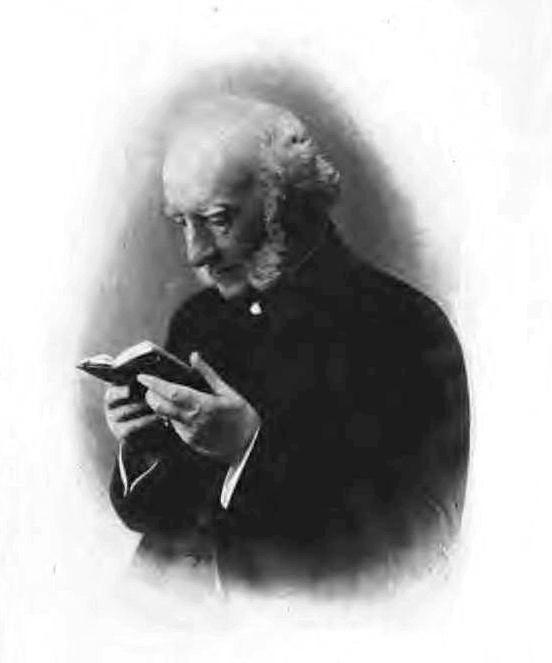
Jessopp in old age

As early as 1855, Jessopp issued a reprint of John Donne's Essays in Divinity with notes. In 1897, he wrote a short life of Donne in the Leaders of Religion series. His One Generation of a Norfolk House must have cost him much labour; it is the story of one of the Walpoles who became a Jesuit in the time of Elizabeth, and it was while he was engaged over it at Mannington Hall, Lord Orford's seat, that he was favoured by a nocturnal visit from a ghostly ecclesiastic in the library. Much good-humoured banter followed his communication of his experience to the press, and probably his picturesque statement helped to draw public attention to this Henry Walpole, an unimportant figure and quite undeserving of the toil and research his vates sacer bestowed upon him. In 1879, he published his History of the Diocese of Norwich; in 1885, The Coming of the Friars and Other Historical Essays; and in 1881 and 1890, Arcady for Better or Worse and The Trials of a Country Parson, his most popular works. In 1890, he edited afresh Bell's edition of the Lives of the Norths.

In 1884, Jessopp theoretically came close to eternal damnation of his soul when he ran foul of the Muggletonians, who claimed to possess this power through issuing curses. His article entitled "The Prophet of Walnut Tree Yard" appeared in the August issue of The Nineteenth Century. Lodowicke Muggleton had been born in Walnut Tree Yard, Bishopsgate, in 1609. Jessopp's article was written with robust humour, probably because the writer assumed the sect extinct or moribund. The mid-century Chambers' Encyclopaedia would have told him just that. Jessopp felt obliged to apologise, which he did on 20 September 1887. However, it could have been much worse. Until the middle of the century, Muggletonians condemned those who ridiculed them. Sir Walter Scott suffered just this fate.

In 1896 he and M. R. James co-edited an edition of Thomas of Monmouth's Life of William of Norwich, containing historical essays on the background to the events, which were the origin of the antisemitic blood libel.

== Academic career and recognition ==
Jessopp became a member by incorporation at Worcester College, Oxford in 1870, and in 1895 he became an honorary Fellow of that Society. His college at Cambridge conferred the same honour on him in the same year. In 1890, Oxford appointed him a select preacher, and his handsome presence and his sonorous voice made him an imposing figure in St Mary's pulpit. In 1895, he became an honorary canon of Norwich, and he was Chaplain-in-Ordinary to King Edward VII from 1902 to 1910.

In 1907, Jessopp was granted a Civil List pension of £50, in addition to a £100 pension previously granted in recognition of his services to archæology and literature. He resigned his benefice in 1911 and went to live at The Chantry, Norwich. On his removal from Scarning he sold most of his valuable library, and the sale attracted considerable attention. It included a number of letters addressed by George Meredith to Dr and Mrs Jessopp, and a number of Meredith first editions with autograph inscriptions of the author.

Jessopp died on 12 February 1914 and was buried at Scarning on 14 February.

A biography of Jessopp has been published: Augustus Jessopp: Norfolk's Antiquary, Nick Hartley, Torre, M & M Baldwin, 2017, ISBN 978-0-947712-53-2

Jessopp gave a talk in the Reading Room in High Street, Tittleshall in 1882 to mostly agricultural workers of the area where he compared life then (1882) to the much harsher conditions (he had discovered from a chest full of old documents) which existed in 1282, citing harsh punishments for very petty offences. The Reading Room still stands.
