= The Ordeal of Richard Feverel =

1859 Novel by George Meredith

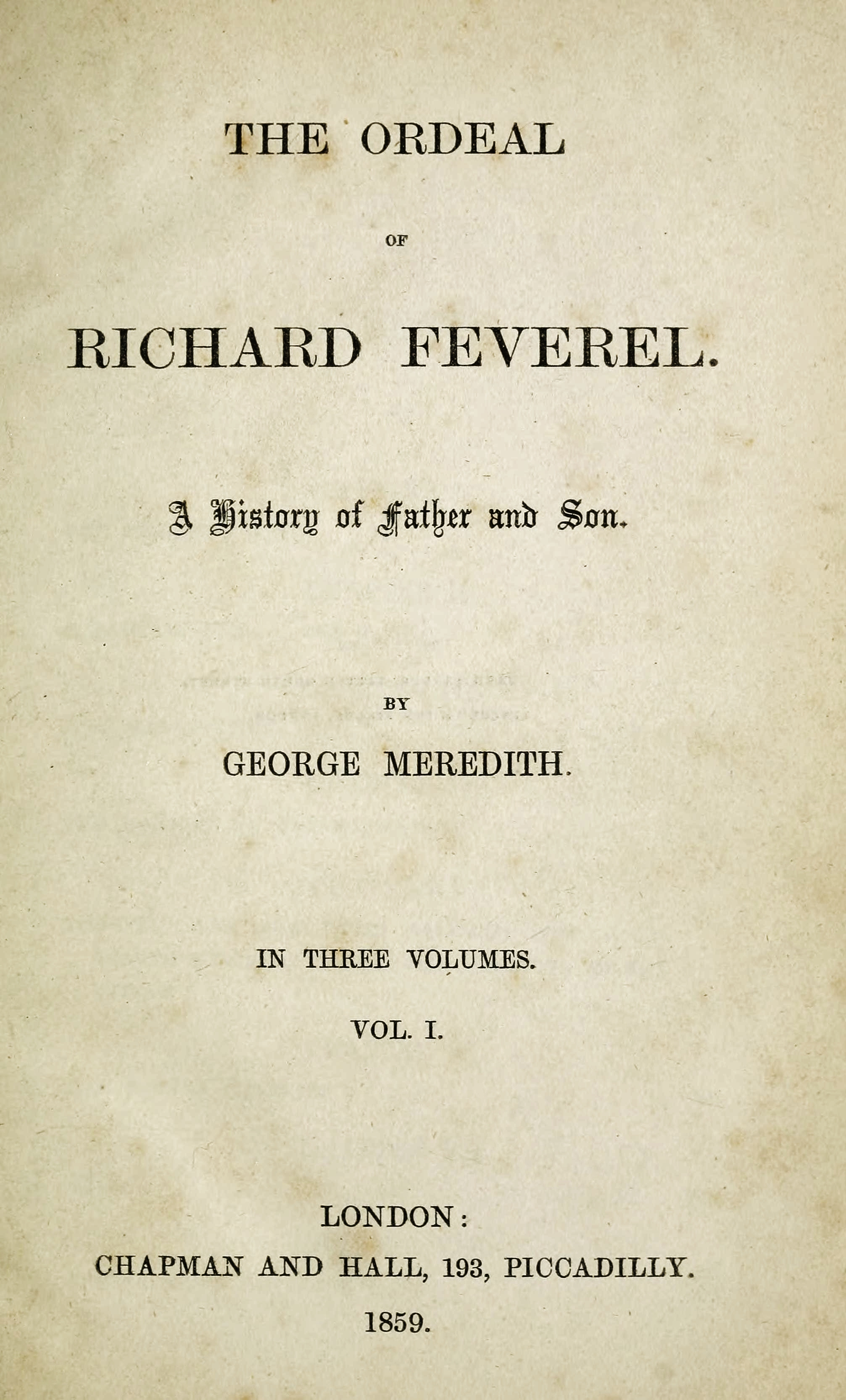
- First edition title page
- Author: George Meredith
- Language: English
- Genre: Philosophical novel
- Publisher: Chapman & Hall
- Publication date: 1859
- Publication place: United Kingdom
- Media type: Print (Hardback)

The Ordeal of Richard Feverel: A History of Father and Son is the earliest full-length novel by George Meredith, published in 1859; its subject is the inability of systems of education to control human passions. It is one of a select group of standard texts that have been included in all four of Everyman's Library (1935), the New American Library of World Literature (1961), Oxford World's Classics (1984), and Penguin Classics (1998). With its rigorous psychological analysis and criticism of contemporary attitudes toward sexuality, it has been seen by some critics as the first modern novel in English literature.

== Synopsis ==
Sir Austin Feverel's wife deserts him to run away with a poet, leaving her husband to raise their son Richard. Believing schools to be corrupt, Sir Austin, a scientific humanist, educates the boy at home with a plan of his own devising known as "the System". This involves strict authoritarian supervision of every aspect of the boy's life, and in particular the prevention of any meeting between Richard and girls of his own age. Richard nevertheless meets and falls in love with Lucy Desborough, the niece of a neighboring farmer. Sir Austin finds out and, disapproving of her humble birth, forbids them to meet again, but they secretly marry. Sir Austin now tries to retrieve the situation by sending Richard to London. Here, however, Sir Austin's friend Lord Mountfalcon successfully sets a courtesan to seduce Richard, hoping that this will leave Lucy open to seduction by himself. Ashamed of his own conduct, Richard flees abroad where he at length hears that Lucy has given birth to a baby and has been reconciled to Sir Austin. He returns to England and, hearing about Lord Mountfalcon's villainy, challenges him to a duel. But this goes badly: Richard is seriously wounded. Lucy is so overcome by this turn of events that she loses her mind and dies.

== Origins ==
In 1856 George Meredith's wife Mary began an affair with the artist Henry Wallis. In the following year, pregnant by Wallis, she ran away to join him, leaving her son Arthur behind. Meredith undertook to bring the child up. The parallels with the opening chapters of the novel are obvious, though Sir Austin is certainly not intended as a self-portrait. Meredith was equivocal in his attitude to Sir Austin's favourite educational theories, which, it has been shown, derived largely from the medical writer William Acton's Prostitution, Considered in Its Moral, Social & Sanitary Aspects (1857) and The Functions and Disorders of the Reproductive Organs (1857), from Herbert Spencer's essay "Moral Education" (Quarterly Review, April 1858), and from Jean-Jacques Rousseau's novel Émile. Several of the characters are based on real people, including Bella Mount (Mary Ellen Meredith), Hippias Feverel (Richard Stephen Charnock), Adrian Harley (Edward FitzGerald's nephew Maurice FitzGerald), and Mrs Berry (Mrs Ockendon).

== Reception ==
The Ordeal of Richard Feverel was first published in 1859 by Chapman & Hall in three volumes. The book received generally respectful reviews, though critics were often puzzled by Meredith's rather dense style, and did not all agree in their reading of the book's message, or their estimation of the author's success in presenting it. The book's commercial success, as with all Victorian novels, depended in large measure on the number of copies bought by the various commercial lending libraries, but the largest of them all, Mudie's, took fright at the sexual frankness of the novel and refused to stock it, casting a taint of unrespectability over Meredith's name that lasted for many years. "I am tabooed from all decent drawing-room tables", Meredith wrote, but he refused to tone down the offending passages. Chapman & Hall left the book unreprinted for nearly twenty years, and when, in 1878, Meredith produced a revised (but not bowdlerized) version, it was published by another firm, Kegan Paul. From the mid-1880s onward Meredith's reputation as a serious novelist reached such a level as to ensure a stream of reprints. For the past hundred years Richard Feverel, with all its faults, has been considered one of Meredith's finest works, its status as a forerunner of many later developments in the novel being widely recognized. Arnold Bennett wrote, "In Richard Feverel, what a loosening of the bonds! What a renaissance!…It was the announcer of a sort of dawn", while acknowledging that "It is a weak book, full of episodic power and overloaded with wit." J. B. Priestley wrote that "So far as English fiction is concerned...there can be no doubt that the modern novel began with the publication of The Ordeal of Richard Feverel." Virginia Woolf's assessment was that:

He makes no attempt to preserve the sober reality of Trollope and Jane Austen; he has destroyed all the usual staircases by which we have learnt to climb. And what is done so deliberately is done with a purpose. This defiance of the ordinary, these airs and graces, the formality of the dialogue with its Sirs and Madams are all there to create an atmosphere that is unlike that of daily life, to prepare the way for a new and an original sense of the human scene.

And again:

The book is cracked through and through with those fissures which come when the author seems to be of twenty minds at the same time. Yet it succeeds in holding miraculously together, not certainly by the depths and originality of its character drawing but by the vigour of its intellectual power and by its lyrical intensity.

== Legacy ==
The Ordeal of Richard Feverel is referred to in E.M. Forster's 1910 novel Howards End. The aspirational character Leonard Bast mentions that it inspired him to leave London and take an all-night walk into the countryside, because he "wanted to get back to the earth...like Richard does in the end." It was referred to again in the Merchant-Ivory adaptation of Howards End, in which Leonard discreetly reads a passage from Richard Feverel at his work and dreams of walking in a bluebell wood. Helen later reads the passage out loud when Leonard mentions it as his inspiration for his all-night walk.

It is also referred to in Anita Brookner's novel, Look At Me. It is the "favorite novel" of Olivia, the narrator Francis's colleague and friend. Francis is planning to give Olivia a first edition as a Christmas present.

Meredith's acquaintance Arthur Quiller-Couch is known to have read the novel and may have adapted the famous writers' adage "murder your darlings" from the line "Killing one's darling child is a painful imposition", describing Richard being forced to burn a manuscript of his poetry by his controlling father.

In 1964 it was adapted into a four-part British television serial of the same title.

== Modern editions ==
- Edited by John Halperin (Oxford: Oxford University Press, 1984) ISBN 0-19-281637-3
- Edited by Edward Mendelson (London: Penguin, 1998) ISBN 0-14-043483-6
