= Emilius Seghers =

Belgian bishop (1855–1927)

His Excellency Emilius Seghers
- Bishop of Ghent
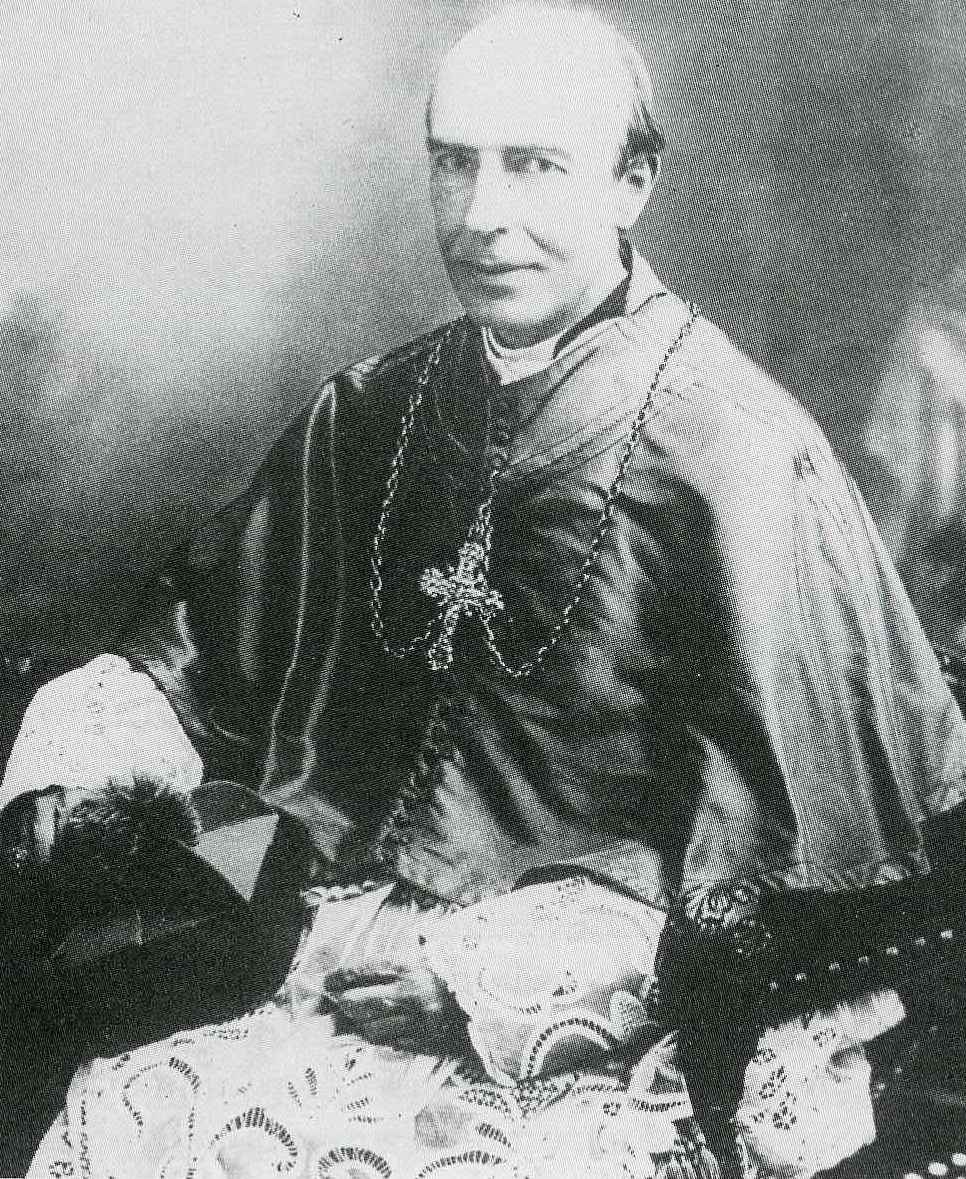
- Mgr. Seghers in 1919
- Diocese: Ghent
- See: St Bavo's
- Appointed: 1917
- Predecessor: Antoon Stillemans
- Successor: Honoré Jozef Coppieters
- Previous post: dean of St John the Baptist's church, Ghent

Orders
- Consecration: 1 May 1917

Personal details
- Born: Emilius Joannes Gerardus Maria Josephus Seghers; 1 September 1855 Ghent, East Flanders, Belgium
- Died: 17 May 1927 (aged 71) Ghent, East Flanders, Belgium
- Education: Sint-Barbaracollege
- Alma mater: Major Seminary of Ghent and Catholic University of Leuven
- Motto: In cruce salus
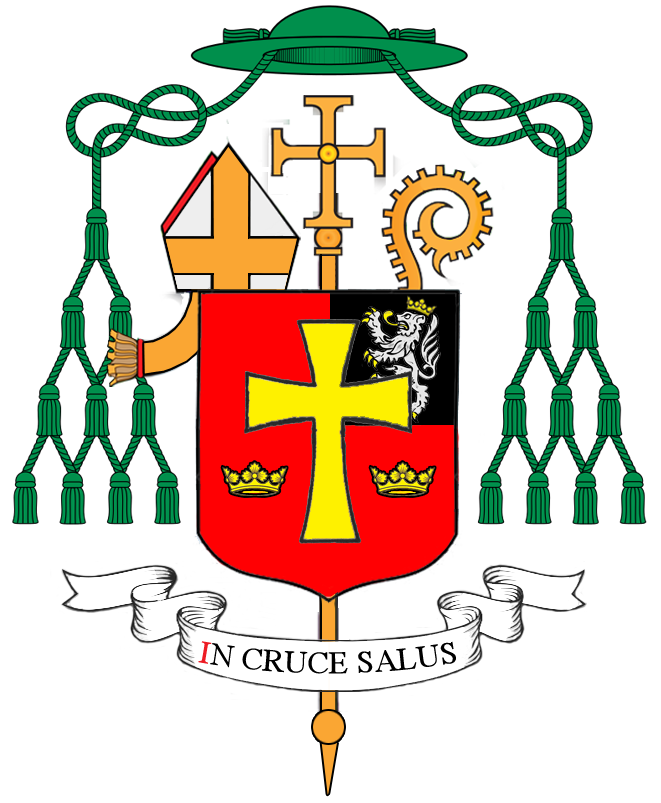
- Coat of arms

Emilius Seghers (1855–1927) was the 25th bishop of Ghent in Belgium.

== Life ==
Seghers was born in Ghent on 3 September 1855, the son of a lawyer. He studied at the Jesuit secondary school in Ghent and the minor seminary. In 1874 he entered the Major Seminary of Ghent for three years of Theology, which he followed with another three years at the Catholic University of Leuven, graduating Licentiate of Sacred Theology in 1880.

After a few months as an assistant in a parish in Ghent he was appointed professor of Moral Theology at the Major Seminary and an honorary canon of Ghent Cathedral on 9 December 1880.

In 1888 he resigned his teaching position and asked the bishop, Henri-Charles Lambrecht, to send him to a working-class parish. On 26 July 1888, he was appointed parish priest of St John the Baptist's church. In April 1898 it became the seat of a new deanery. In February 1917, five months after the death of Antoon Stillemans (bishop 1890–1916), Seghers was appointed to succeed as bishop. He was consecrated on 1 May the same year, taking In cruce salus as his motto. His position was made more difficult by the German occupation of Belgium during World War I.

After the First World War, Seghers promoted spiritual renewal through Eucharistic Congresses, which were held in Ghent (1922), Eeklo (1923) and Sint-Niklaas (1924), and diocesan pilgrimages to Lourdes, which were organised from 1921 onwards. He also founded a Federation of Catholic Women in the diocese. In 1926, suffering from ill health, he asked for a coadjutor, and in March 1927 Honoré Jozef Coppieters was appointed such. Seghers died in Ghent on 17 May 1927.

== Publications ==
- Statuta in Synodo diocesana (Ghent, 1924)
- Het diocesaan eucharistisch Congres te Gent (Ghent, 1922)
- Het gewestelijk eucharistisch congres van Sint-Niklaas (Ghent, 1923)
- Het gewestelijk eucharistisch congres van 't Meetjesland (Ghent, 1924)
