= Jean-François van de Velde =

Jan Frans van de Velde
- Bishop of Ghent
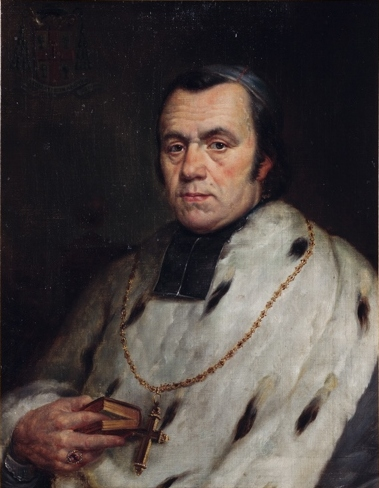
- Province: Mechelen
- Diocese: Ghent
- See: St Bavo's
- Installed: 18 November 1829
- Term ended: 1838
- Predecessor: Maurice-Jean de Broglie
- Successor: Louis-Joseph Delebecque
- Other post: Dean of Lier

Orders
- Ordination: 1802
- Consecration: 8 November 1829

Personal details
- Born: 8 September 1779 Boom, Duchy of Brabant, Austrian Netherlands
- Died: 7 August 1838 (aged 58) Ghent, East Flanders, Belgium
- Buried: St Bavo's Cathedral, Ghent
- Denomination: Catholic
- Motto: Auxilium meum a Domino
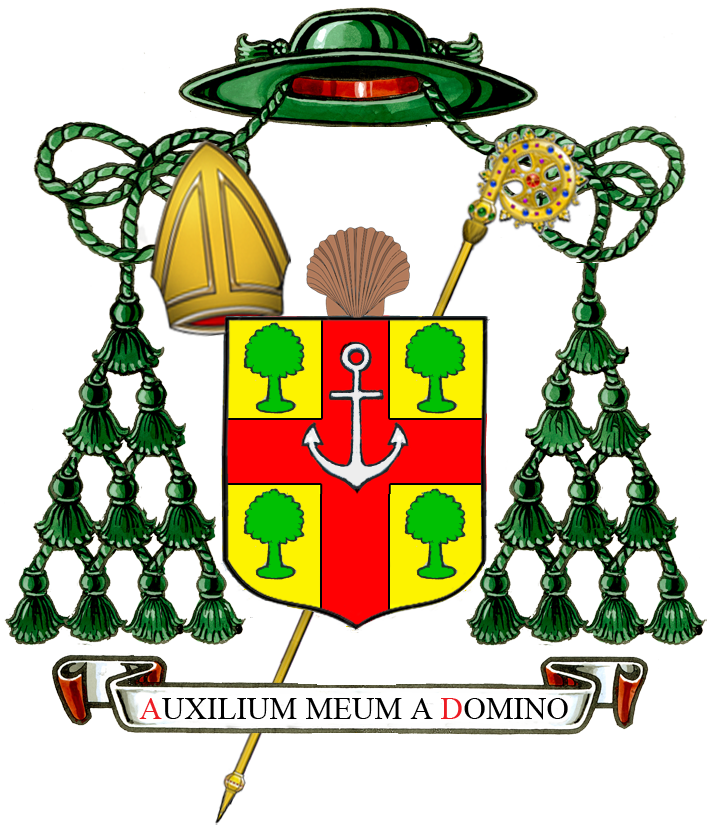
- Coat of arms

Jan Frans van de Velde (1779–1838) was the 20th bishop of Ghent, in Belgium, from November 1829 until his death.

== Life ==
Van de Velde was born in Boom on 8 September 1779. After secondary education at Merksem, near Antwerp, he began studying Philosophy and Theology at Antwerp seminary. His studies there were interrupted by the seminary's closure in 1797. He was ordained priest at Emmerich am Rhein in 1802.

Between 1803 and 1825 he served in a number of parishes in and around Antwerp. On 13 April 1825 was named dean of Lier, and in 1829, to his surprise, bishop of Ghent, in succession to Maurice-Jean de Broglie, who had been banished in 1817 and died in 1821. He arrived in Ghent on 7 November 1829 and was consecrated the following day in his cathedral by the bishop of Tournai. He was solemnly enthroned on 18 November.

His relations with the government of the United Kingdom of the Netherlands were difficult, due to differing interpretations of rights to religious liberty and free expression. He swiftly placed himself under the authority of the Provisional Government of Belgium set up by the Belgian Revolution.

On 27 May 1834 the diocese of Ghent was split to re-establish the diocese of Bruges, the territory of which now corresponded to the province of West Flanders.

Van de Velde approved and encouraged new congregations for charitable apostolates, including the Sisters of Charity of Jesus and Mary, and was active in the establishment of diocesan schools, minor seminaries, and parish Sunday schools. One of his first actions as bishop, on 2 December 1829, had been to decree the re-establishment of the Major Seminary of Ghent, which reopened on 3 February 1830. In 1833 the Jesuits obtained permission to set up the Sint-Barbaracollege in the city, and the Dominicans returned to Ghent in 1835. At a meeting of the Belgian bishops in Mechelen, in the summer of 1833, Van de Velde proposed the founding of the Catholic University of Belgium, which opened in Mechelen on 4 November 1834, and transferred to Leuven in 1835 as the Catholic University of Leuven.

He died at Ghent on 7 August 1838 and was buried in his cathedral.

Catholic Church titles
Preceded by Maurice-Jean de Broglie	Bishop of Ghent; 1829–1838	Succeeded by Louis-Joseph Delebecque
