= Oscar Joliet =

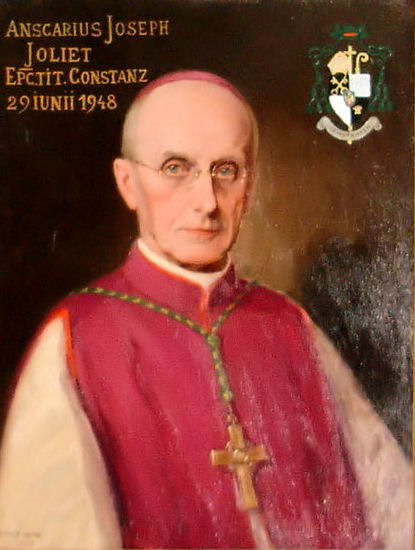

Oscar Joliet (13 September 1878 - 3 February 1969) was a scholar-priest who served between 1948 and 1969 as the Auxiliary bishop of Ghent.

== Life ==
Oscar Jozef Joliet was born in Ghent, third recorded son of the baker, Augustus Joliet (1838-1914) and his wife Lucia Joliet-Ysebaert from Zelzate. He attended school at the Sint-Barbaracollege, a Jesuit establishment in the city. Between 1896 and 1905 he attended the Pontifical Gregorian University in Rome. It was here that he received his doctorate of philosophy on 1 June 1901, and was ordained into the priesthood on 20 September 1902. Still at the Gregorian University, on 30 June 1905 he received his doctorate in theology and on 25 June 1907 he received his doctorate in canon law.

In 1907 he returned to Belgium, now based in East Flanders where on 6 September 1907 he took up an appointment as Professor of Philosophy at the St. Joseph Minor Seminary in Sint-Niklaas. He remained at Sint-Niklaas till 1919, when on 7 September he was appointed professor - later also director - at the Episcopal Seminary in Ghent. In Ghent he had also been a canon of the Chapter of Ghent since 1 January 1919.

He went back to Rome in 1927. He took over as president of the Belgian Pontifical College on 29 August 1927, remaining in the post till 1945. Returning to Belgium after the war he became archdeacon and deacon at St Bavo's Cathedral, Ghent on 4 September 1945. He became vicar-general in Ghent with special responsibility for training and education on 6 March 1948.

On 17 April 1948 Joliet was appointed titular bishop of Constantia in Arabia, a necessary corollary for his consecration in June of that year as auxiliary bishop in Ghent. His principal consecrator was Karel Justinus Calewaert who had himself been consecrated Bishop of Ghent two months earlier.

Oscar Joliet died in Ghent on 3 February 1969 some months after his ninetieth birthday.

His elder brothers, Edmond (1875-1944) and Edgard (1876-1954), had also been Roman Catholic priests.
