= Roger-Wauthier van der Noot, 1st Baron of Carloo =

Baron

Roger-Wauthier van der Noot, born 27 February 1644, was a mayor of Brussels. He became the 1st Baron of Carloo.

== Family ==
Roger-Wauthier van der Noot was the second son of Gilles van der Noot, Lord of Carloo, and Anne of Leefdael. His older brother, Philips Erard, became bishop of Ghent. Roger-Wauthier married Anne-Louise vander Gracht and had 10 successive sons and a daughter. They were buried in Uccle.

Roger-Wauthier van der Noot, 1st Baron of Carloo,
married to Anne-Louis vander Gracht, Lady of Cortenbach.

  - Philippe-François van der Noot, 2nd Baron of Carloo;
    married to Antoinette d'Oyenbrugghe, Countess of Duras.
    - Philippe-Joseph van der Noot (+1748),
      married to Honorine-Françoise, baronnes of Hamme
      - Jean-Joseph van der Noot, Count of Duras, Baron of Carloo; Dies without heirs.
      - Anna van der Noot, married to Carl-Julius von Metzndorf.
      - Anne-Louise van der Noot (1744), married to Charles-Guillaume d'Alegamba, Count of Auderghem.
  - Jean-Joseph van der Noot, 1st Baron of Capelle:
    Teutonic knight.
  - Charles-Bonaventure, 1st Count van der Noot: descendants upon today, amongst them the current Marquess of Assche.
  - Maximilian-Anthoine van der Noot,
  - Guillaume-Louis van der Noot,
  - Roger-Lamoral van der Noot,
  - Maximilian-emmanuel van der Noot, Lord of Houtain
  - wauthier-Gilbert van der Noot,
  - Andrien-François van der Noot, noble Canon at the Cathedral chapter in Ghent.
  - Anne-Philippine van der Noot,
    married to lancelot de Gottignies, Lord-Chamberlain of the Empress

== Career ==
Van der Noot served as mayor 1700-1702 and was succeeded by Charles van den Berghe, count of Limminghe.
