= Gustaaf Joos =

His Eminence Gustaaf Joos
- Cardinal-Deacon of San Pier Damiani ai Monti di San Paolo
- Church: Roman Catholic Church
- Appointed: 21 October 2003
- Installed: 22 February 2004
- Term ended: 2 November 2004
- Predecessor: Pietro Palazzini
- Successor: Agostino Vallini
- Previous post: Titular Archbishop of Ypres (2003)

Orders
- Ordination: 28 April 1946
- Consecration: 11 October 2003 by Arthur Luysterman
- Created cardinal: 21 October 2003 by Pope John Paul II
- Rank: Cardinal-deacon

Personal details
- Born: Gustaaf Joos; 5 July 1923 Sint-Niklaas, East Flanders, Belgium
- Died: 2 November 2004 (aged 81) Oosterzele, East Flanders, Belgium
- Education: Pontifical Gregorian University
- Motto: Diliges Deum

Gustaaf Joos (Dutch pronunciation: [ˈɣystaːf ˈjoːs]; 5 July 1923 – 2 November 2004) was a prelate of the Diocese of Ghent, who was elevated to the Catholic College of Cardinals on 21 October 2003 by Pope John Paul II.

== Biography ==
He studied with Karol Woytyla in the Belgian Pontifical College before the latter's election to Pope John Paul II. Before his nomination as cardinal he was made a member of the St Bavo Chapter in 1961. Canon Joos was a judicial vicar in ecclesiastical tribunals of the diocese of Ghent, doctor in canon law. He was professor at CIBI and the seminary.

In 2003 the Vatican published the wish of the pope to create Joos cardinal in the next Consistory. In Belgium everyone was surprised, in the Belgian media he was only known as a parish priest. Belgian media mistook him for another priest just after he was elevated to cardinal. It was the first time in the history of the diocese that a canon was elevated to cardinal. His elevation as cardinal was seen by many as gratitude from Pope John Paul II towards his long-time friend.

After announcing his intention to elevate Canon Joos to the rank of cardinal, Pope John Paul also appointed him titular Bishop of Ypres, and Joos was consecrated on 7 October 2003, days before the consistory at which he became a member of the College of Cardinals. After his elevation, Cardinal Joos continued to live in the Diocese of Ghent, serving as a parish priest and as judicial vicar in ecclesiastical tribunals.

The cardinal died in Landskouter, and received a pontifical funeral in Saint-Bavo cathedral. He was buried like requested in Landskouter, and not in the Cathedral of Ghent.

== Interview of Gustaaf Joos with P-magazine ==
Joos gained notoriety in January 2004, when in an interview to Belgian P-Magazine, he said, about homosexuals:

"I am prepared to sign here in my blood that of all those who say they are lesbian or gay, at most five to 10 per cent are effectively lesbian or gay. All the rest are sexual perverts. I demand you write this down. If they come to protest on my doorstep, I don't care. I'm just speaking out on what thousands of people are thinking but never get a chance to say. Real homosexuals don't wander in the streets in colourful suits. Those are people who have a serious problem and have to live with that. And if they err, they will be forgiven."

about politics and universal suffrage:

"Politics, democracy. Don't make me laugh. The right to vote, what is that all about? I find it strange that a snot-nosed 18-year-old has the same vote as a father of seven. One has no responsibilities whatsoever, the other provides tomorrow's citizens. "

and about prostitution:

"If a man thinks he needs sex or is going to explode, it is better to find a prostitute than seduce or rape a girl. At least there are no innocent victims involved".

Joos also expressed admiration for Cyriel Verschaeve, a Belgian priest and poet who was convicted as a Nazi collaborator for recruiting young men for the Eastern Front during the Second World War.

This interview created a stir in some Belgian media. Upon the fierce reaction of those media, Joos always stood by his comments. Godfried Cardinal Danneels distanced himself from Joos through his spokesman Toon Osaer, while the Belgian Centre for Equal Opportunities and Opposition to Racism threatened to sue him for violating an anti-discrimination law. As a consequence of this interview, Cardinal Joos received death threats.
