= Henricus Franciscus Bracq =

Belgian bishop

- Bishop of Ghent
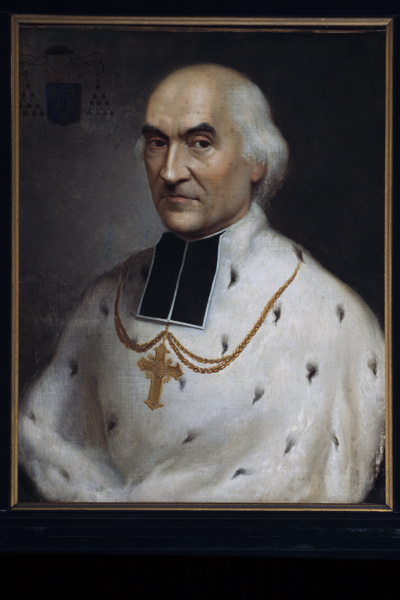
- Portrait from Ghent Cathedral
- Province: Mechelen
- Diocese: Ghent
- See: St Bavo's
- Predecessor: Louis-Joseph Delebecque
- Successor: Henri-Charles Lambrecht

Orders
- Consecration: 1 May 1865

Personal details
- Born: 26 February 1804 Ghent, Department Escaut, Republic of France
- Died: 17 June 1888 (aged 84) Ghent, East Flanders, Belgium
- Buried: St Bavo's Cathedral, Ghent
- Education: Major Seminary of Ghent
- Motto: In nomine Domini
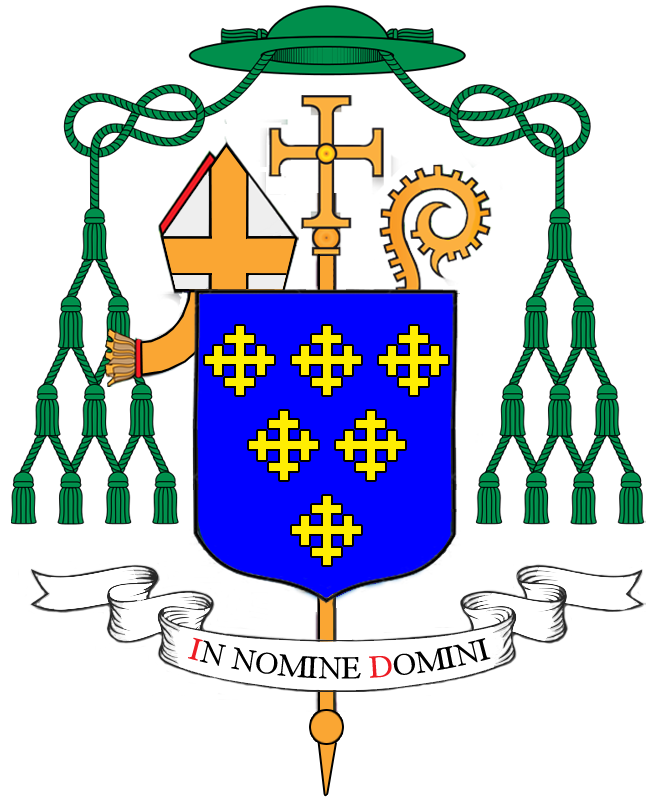
- Coat of arms

Henricus Franciscus Bracq (1804–1888) was the 22nd bishop of Ghent, Belgium.

== Life ==
Bracq was born in Ghent on 26 February 1804. He was ordained to the priesthood on 2 August 1827. From 1830 to 1864 he taught Sacred Scripture at the Major Seminary of Ghent, where he opposed the spread of the opinions of Lamennais. He was one of the founding editors of the Mémorial du Clergé (1833–1834) and of De Vlaming, and an active contributor to the Journal historique et littéraire published in Liège. From 1836 to 1864 he was also confessor to the refounded Visitation Sisters of Ghent.

In November 1864 Bracq was elected bishop of Ghent in succession to Louis-Joseph Delebecque, who had died the previous month. He was consecrated on 1 May 1865. As bishop he founded the Sint-Lievenscollege in Ghent in 1865, as well as diocesan secondary schools in Ledeberg, Aalst and Ninove (1872), and opposed the semi-traditionalism taught at the Catholic University of Leuven by Casimir Ubaghs. In 1866 he founded a diocesan weekly, De Godsdienstige Week van Vlaanderen. An Ultramontane by inclination, he attended the First Vatican Council, promoted Peter's Pence, and supported the Papal Zouaves. Bracq took an active role in the social and political crisis known as the First School War, in opposition to the encroachments of the state on Catholic education. He died in Ghent on 17 June 1888.

== Writings ==
- Prolegomena in Sacram Scripturam (1833); several editions to 1865
- Petite Histoire sainte à l’usage des écoles gardiennes (1851)
- Korte bemerkingen en raadgevingen over de gezondheid, ten gebruike der Katholieke scholen (undated)

Catholic Church titles
Preceded by Jean-François van de Velde	Bishop of Ghent; 1864–1888	Succeeded by Henri-Charles Lambrecht
