= St John the Baptist's church, Ghent =

Parish church in Ghent, Belgium

Coordinates: 51°3′32″N 3°42′13″E

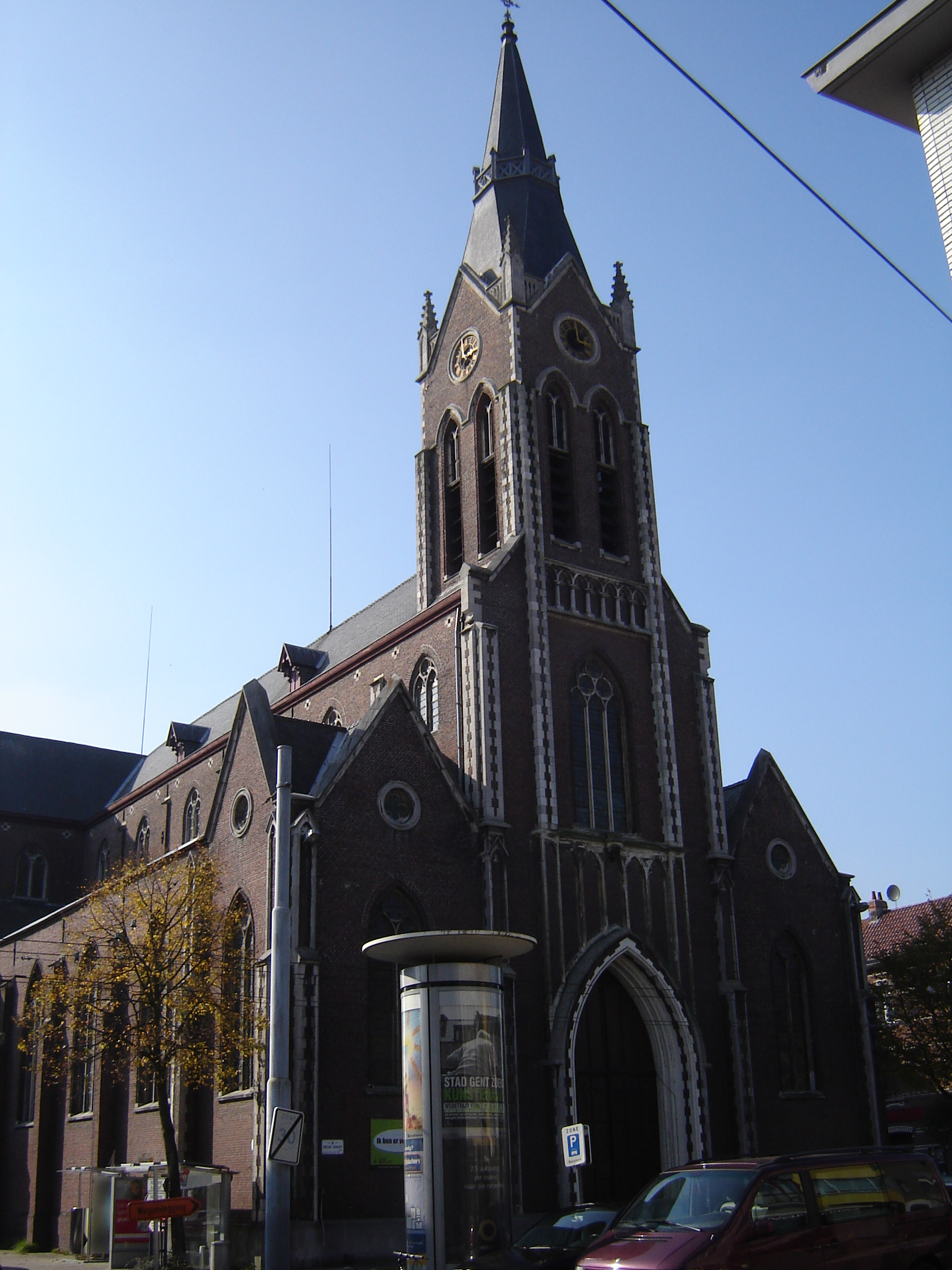

The Church of St John the Baptist (Dutch: Sint-Jan Baptistkerk) was a Gothic Revival parish church and seat of a deanery in the Brugse Poort neighbourhood of Ghent, Belgium, an industrial area that arose as part of the city's 19th-century expansion.

The initial building, to designs by J. Van Hoecke, was completed in 1860 and collapsed in 1863. It was rebuilt to adapted designs and completed in 1866. The church was consecrated on 7 October 1866.

The interior was also Gothic Revival, with altars, choir stalls, confessionals and communion rail probably designed by Jean-Baptiste Bethune. The original murals were removed in the 1970s.

In April 1898, the parish church became the seat of a new deanery.

In 2016, the building was deconsecrated and put up for sale.

For almost 30 years, from 1888 until 1917, the parish priest was Emilius Seghers, who became the 25th bishop of Ghent. The square in front of the church is named Emilius Seghersplein in his honour.
