= Philips Erard van der Noot =

Dutch bishop (1638–1730)

- Bishop of Ghent
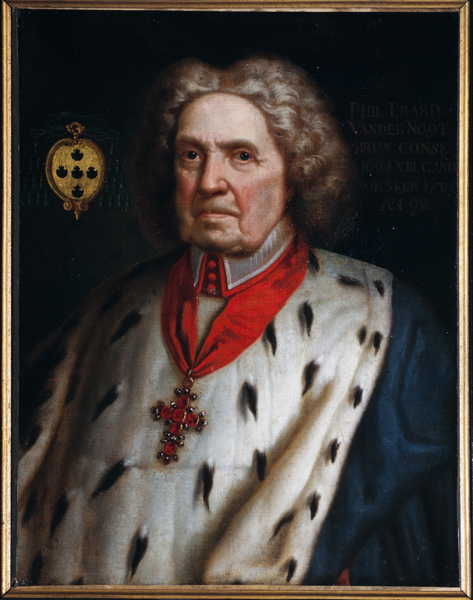
- Province: Mechelen
- Diocese: Ghent
- See: St Bavo's
- Installed: 1695
- Term ended: 1730
- Predecessor: Albert de Hornes
- Successor: Jan-Baptist de Smet
- Other post: Archpriest of St. Rumbold's Cathedral

Personal details
- Born: 6 February 1638 Uccle, Duchy of Brabant, Spanish Netherlands
- Died: 3 February 1730 (aged 91) Ghent, County of Flanders, Austrian Netherlands
- Buried: St Bavo's Cathedral, Ghent
- Denomination: Catholic
- Motto: Respice finem
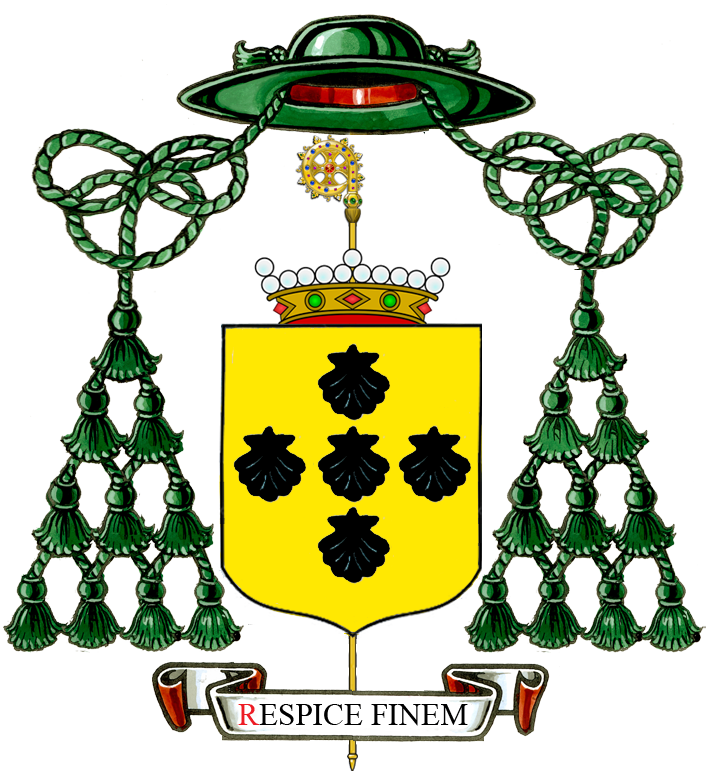
- Coat of arms: Philips Erard van der Noot's coat of arms

Philips Erard van der Noot (1638–1730) was the 13th Bishop of Ghent.

== Family ==
He was born in Uccle on 6 February 1638 as the eldest son of Gilles van der Noot, Lord of Carloo. He was a relative of the Marquess of Assche. His brother, Roger-Wauthier van der Noot, 1st Baron of Carloo was Mayor of Brussels.

== Career ==
After his ordination, he was made a canon and eventually became Archpriest of the Chapter of St. Rumbold's Cathedral in Mechelen. He was created bishop of Ghent after royal permission of the king of Spain.

In Ghent he erected the chapel in Honour of Saint Amandus on the Campo Santo, and began renovations to the diocesan seminary.

He died in Ghent on 3 February 1730. He is buried in the Ghent Cathedral, in the Choir. His baroque tomb was designed by Jan-Baptist Helderberghe, Jan Boeksent and Pieter de Sutter. He was the uncle of a later bishop of Ghent, Maximiliaan Antoon van der Noot.

Catholic Church titles
Preceded by Albert de Hornes	Bishop of Ghent; 1695–1730	Succeeded by Jan-Baptist de Smet
