= Eugène van Rechem =

Belgian auxiliary bishop

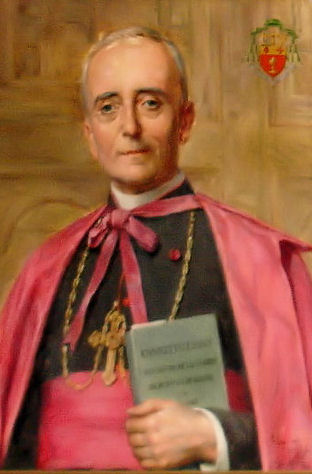
Portrait.

Eugène Victor Marie van Rechem (born 8 April 1858; died Ghent, 21 August 1943) was a Belgian auxiliary bishop of the Diocese of Ghent.

During his career Rechem was Canon of St Bavo's Cathedral, Ghent, and president of the Major Seminary of Ghent. He gained fame as president of the Sisters of Charity of Jesus and Mary and established missions in the Belgian Congo.

He was consecrated as a bishop in 1914 by Antoon Stillemans.

A sportsman himself in his younger years, he was instrumental in the 1939 foundation of a training college for PE instructors at Catholic girls' schools.

His portrait is kept in St Bavo's Cathedral.

== Honours ==
- 1931: commander in the Royal Order of the Lion.
