= Lucas Van Looy =

Belgian prelate

The Most Reverend Lucas Van Looy S.D.B.
- Bishop Emeritus of Ghent
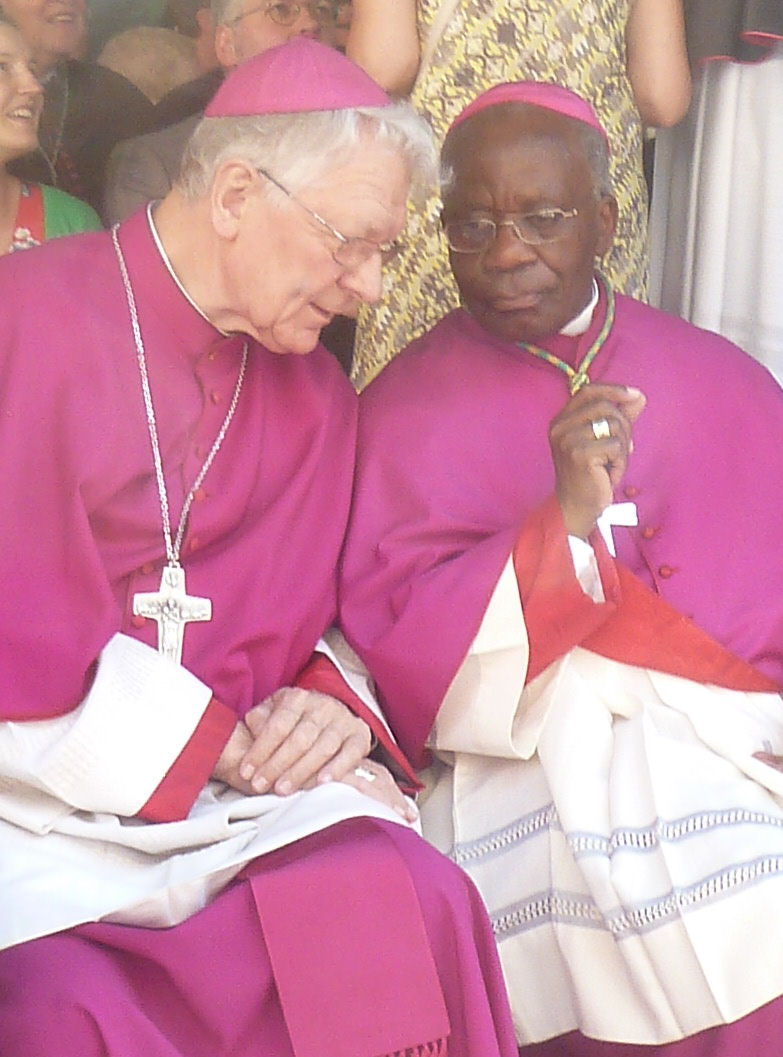
- Van Looy with Nuncio Augustine Kasujja in 2017
- Church: Catholic Church
- Diocese: Ghent
- See: Ghent
- Appointed: 19 December 2003
- Installed: 1 February 2004
- Term ended: 27 November 2019
- Predecessor: Arthur Luysterman
- Successor: Lode Van Hecke
- Previous post: Apostolic Administrator of Ghent (2019-20)

Orders
- Ordination: 12 September 1970 by Paul Constant Schoenmaekers
- Consecration: 1 February 2004 by Godfried Danneels

Personal details
- Born: 28 September 1941 (age 85) Tielen, Belgium
- Motto: In nomine Patris ("In the name of the Father")
- Coat of arms: Lucas Van Looy's coat of arms

Lucas Van Looy S.D.B. (born 28 September 1941) is a Belgian prelate of the Catholic Church who was Bishop of Ghent from 2004 to 2019. He worked as a missionary in South Korea for more than a decade and held leadership positions with the Salesians from 1984 to 2003.

Although Pope Francis planned to make him a cardinal in August 2022, he agreed not to at Van Looy's request.

== Biography ==
Van Looy was born in Tielen, Belgium. He studied with the Jesuits in Turnhout and at Don Bosco College in Hechtel. He became a member of the Salesians of Saint John Bosco in 1961 and studied from 1962 to 1964 at their school in Groot-Bijgaarden. After three years in South Korea he studied theology at the Catholic University of Louvain from 1967 to 1970, earning a licentiate in missiology. He took his final vows as a Salesian on 6 March 1968 and was ordained a priest on 12 September 1970.

He worked in South Korea as a teacher from 1972 to 1974 and as chaplain of Catholic students from 1974 to 1978. He then held a series of positions in the leadership of the Salesians: provincial from 1968 to 1984, head of missions from 1984 to 1990, youth ministry head from 1990 to 1996, and Vicar General from 1996 to 2003.

He was appointed Bishop of the Diocese of Ghent by Pope John Paul II on 19 December 2003, and consecrated bishop by Cardinal Godfried Danneels on 1 February 2004.

In 2005, he paid $25,000 to a victim of a Belgian priest but failed to notify civil authorities that the priest continued to run an orphanage in Rwanda until 2014. In 2007, Bishop Van Looy assigned another Belgian priest who had been found guilty of sexually assaulting a minor in 1994 to a new parish. When the case was reported by local media in 2010 he defended the decision.

In 2010, after Archbishop André-Joseph Léonard of Mechelen-Brussels described AIDS as a form of justice imposed on those who have engaged in promiscuous sex, Van Looy joined those criticizing such a viewpoint. He said: "It cannot be allowed, I think, that the sick after such a statement now have to suffer even more because they have been so stigmatized." He also allowed that "stable homosexual relationships" should be possible.

On 29 March 2014, Pope Francis named him a member of the Congregation for Institutes of Consecrated Life and Societies of Apostolic Life.

He became chair of Caritas Europe in May 2014. In July 2015 he was named to the executive board of Caritas International by Pope Francis.

After the bishops of Belgium named him an alternate delegate to the October 2015 Synod of Bishops on the Family, Pope Francis included Van Looy among his own appointed delegates. He was a papal nominee to the 2018 Synod of Bishops on Youth as well. He told that Synod that the evaluation of candidates for the priesthood needed to consider the broader community's views, not just the recommendations of teachers and clerical superiors, but "also the parish priest, the catechists, the cook, the men and women who serve the community should be heard".

Pope Francis accepted his retirement in December 2018, but asked him to remain as bishop until his successor was appointed. On 27 November 2019, Pope Francis accepted his resignation and named Lode Van Hecke to succeed him.

On 29 May 2022, Pope Francis announced he would make him a cardinal at a consistory scheduled for 27 August. Van Looy later asked that he not be made a cardinal and Pope Francis agreed. He received a cardinals ring from the pope that Van Looy describes as a personal gift without canonical effect.
