= Karel Justinus Calewaert =

Belgian Roman Catholic bishop

- Bishop of Ghent
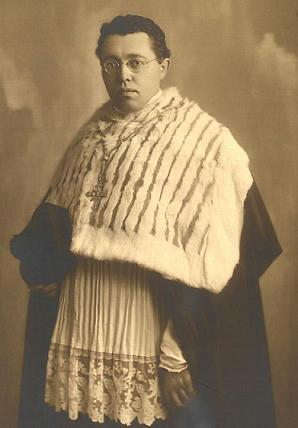
- Native name: Charles-Justin Calewaert
- Church: Catholic Church
- Diocese: Diocese of Ghent
- In office: 28 January 1948 – 27 December 1963
- Predecessor: Honoré Jozef Coppieters
- Successor: Léonce-Albert Van Peteghem

Orders
- Ordination: 23 April 1922
- Consecration: 8 March 1948 by Jozef-Ernest van Roey

Personal details
- Born: 17 October 1893 Deinze, East Flanders, Belgium
- Died: 27 December 1963 (aged 70) Ghent, East Flanders, Belgium
- Education: Catholic University of Leuven

Karel Justinus Calewaert (17 October 1893 – 27 December 1963) was a Belgian Catholic bishop.

== Life ==
=== Early years ===
Calevaert was born in Deinze, a small town a short distance to the southwest of Ghent. His father, also named Justinus Calewaert, was a successful businessman, with premises in the Tolpoortstraat, who also ran a distillery. When war broke out in 1914 Calevaert went initially to England, but he later returned to Belgium and served as a stretcher-bearer on the front line.

He studied at St Hendrik's College in Deinze and at the St Barbara College, a Jesuit school in Ghent, before moving on to the Catholic University of Louvain. He was ordained into the priesthood on 23 April 1922.

=== Priest ===
On 4 February 1925 he took a post as professor of Moral theology at the "CIBE" (military academy) in Leopoldsburg, becoming director at this institution in 1927. On 1 October 1931 he was appointed president of the Main Seminary at Ghent, and in 1940 he became Vicar general for the diocese. In the context of the linguistic sensitivities of the time and place, the Ghent born composer Ignace de Sutter observed that Calewaert appeared to come from the Francophone class ("....les gens d'expression française"), although since he came from Deinze he also spoke perfectly good Flemish (Dutch).

=== Bishop ===
On 28 January 1948 Calewaert was appointed 27th Bishop of Ghent in succession to Honoré Jozef Coppieters who had died the previous month. Calewaert, now aged 54, was installed on 8 March 1948. He took as his motto "Caritate veritatis" ("From Love of Truth").

On 17 April 1948 Oscar Joliet was appointed as Calewaert's auxiliary bishop.

In 1950 he dedicated the St Paul Seminary at Mariakerke in the chateau bequeathed by the aristocrat-politician Amand Casier de ter Beken, where seminarians could undertake the first two years of their training. On 16 May 1954 he dedicated the entire complex at Mariagrot van Maldegem-Kleit.

During the 1955 schools conflict he wrote, on 8 July 1955, a pastoral letter calling on the faithful to support free education through the "School and family" programme, in respect of which a commemorative plaque was produced in 1958. Also in 1955, on 19 December 1955, it fell to Caelwaert to dedicate the important Temse Bridge at Themse when it was opened by The King.

Karel Justinus Calewaert died on 12 March 1963, a couple of months after his 70th birthday. His body was buried in the crypt of his cathedral, St Bavo's Cathedral, Ghent.

== See also ==
- Catholic Church in Belgium
