= Jan Baptist de Smet =

Dutch priest

- Bishop of Ghent
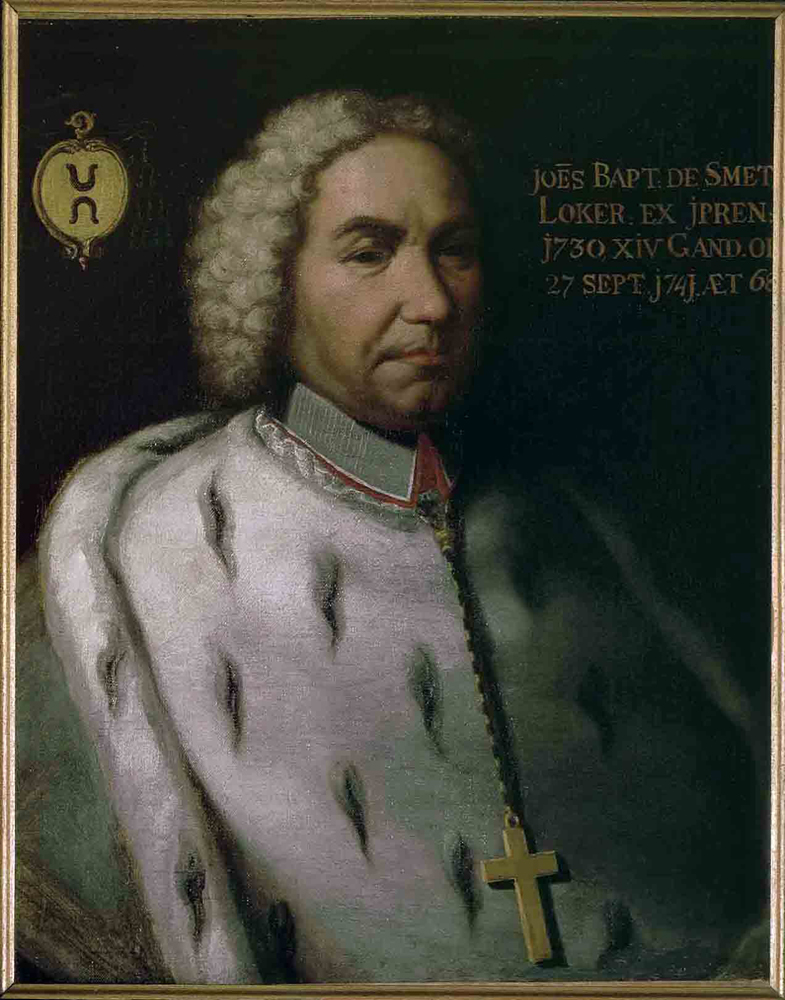
- Province: Mechelen
- Diocese: Ghent
- See: St Bavo's
- Installed: 1732
- Term ended: 1741
- Predecessor: Philips Erard van der Noot
- Successor: Maximiliaan Antoon van der Noot
- Other posts: Secular canon in Mechelen (1705–1721); Chairman of the Mechelen Seminary (1705–); Vicar general of the Archdiocese of Mechelen (1705–); Bishop of Ypres (1721–1732)

Personal details
- Born: 1 February 1674 Lokeren, County of Flanders, Spanish Netherlands
- Died: 27 September 1741 (aged 67) Ghent, County of Flanders, Austrian Netherlands
- Buried: St Bavo's Cathedral, Ghent
- Denomination: Catholic
- Motto: Caelestia cude arma

Jan Baptist de Smet (1 February 1674 – 27 September 1741) was the 14th Bishop of Ghent and the 15th Bishop of Ypres.

== Early life ==
Jan Baptist de Smet was born to Gilles de Smet (court clerk in Lokeren of the fief of the Waasland) and Anna Vermeiren.

After his secondary education with the Augustinians in Ghent, he went to the universities of Leuven where he first studied liberal arts and obtained a degree in theology in 1703. In 1700 he was ordained a priest. In 1703 he became dean (plebaan) of the Church of St. Michael and St. Gudula (now Brussels' cathedral) and on 29 April 1705 he was appointed secular canon of the Saint Rumbold chapter in Mechelen by the Archbishop of Mechelen Thomas Philip Wallrad de Hénin-Liétard d'Alsace and at the beginning of May 1705 he was also chairman of the Mechelen Seminary. He was also appointed Vicar general of the archdiocese.

Beside all these ministries, he was a preacher, a confessor, an administrator of several monasteries, a synodal researcher and book inspector.

== Bishop ==
=== Bishop of Ypres ===
Charles VI appointed him Bishop of Ypres in 1718, but it was not until 3 February 1721 that his appointment was confirmed by Pope Clement XI. He was then 47 years old.

In Ypres he found a diocese where no bishop recognized by the pope had been in power since 1713 as a result of disputes between France, Spain and Pope Clement XI.

=== Bishop of Ghent ===
On 1 March 1730 the regent Maria Elisabeth of Austria appointed him bishop of Ghent. On 6 August 1731, his appointment was confirmed by the Pope (Clement XII) and he was installed on 2 March, 1732. His motto was Caelestia cude arma.

That same day he was registered in the crossbow archers' guild (foot archers) of Saint George of Ghent.

On 27 September 1741 he died and was interred in the crypt of St Bavo's Cathedral. He was 67 years old.

His mausoleum (sculpted by Jacques Bergé) is located against the choir enclosure in the south ambulatory of Saint Bavo's Cathedral, opposite Saint-Gilles Chapel.

== Gallery ==
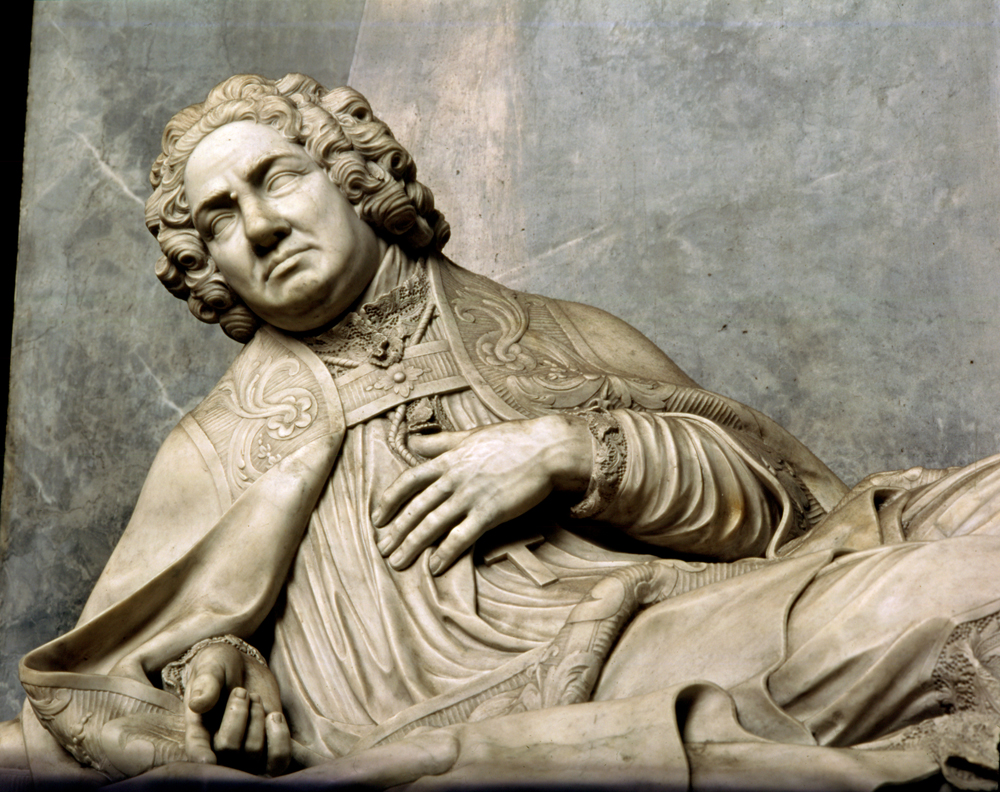
Tomb of Jan Baptist de Smet (1745) by Jacques Bergé

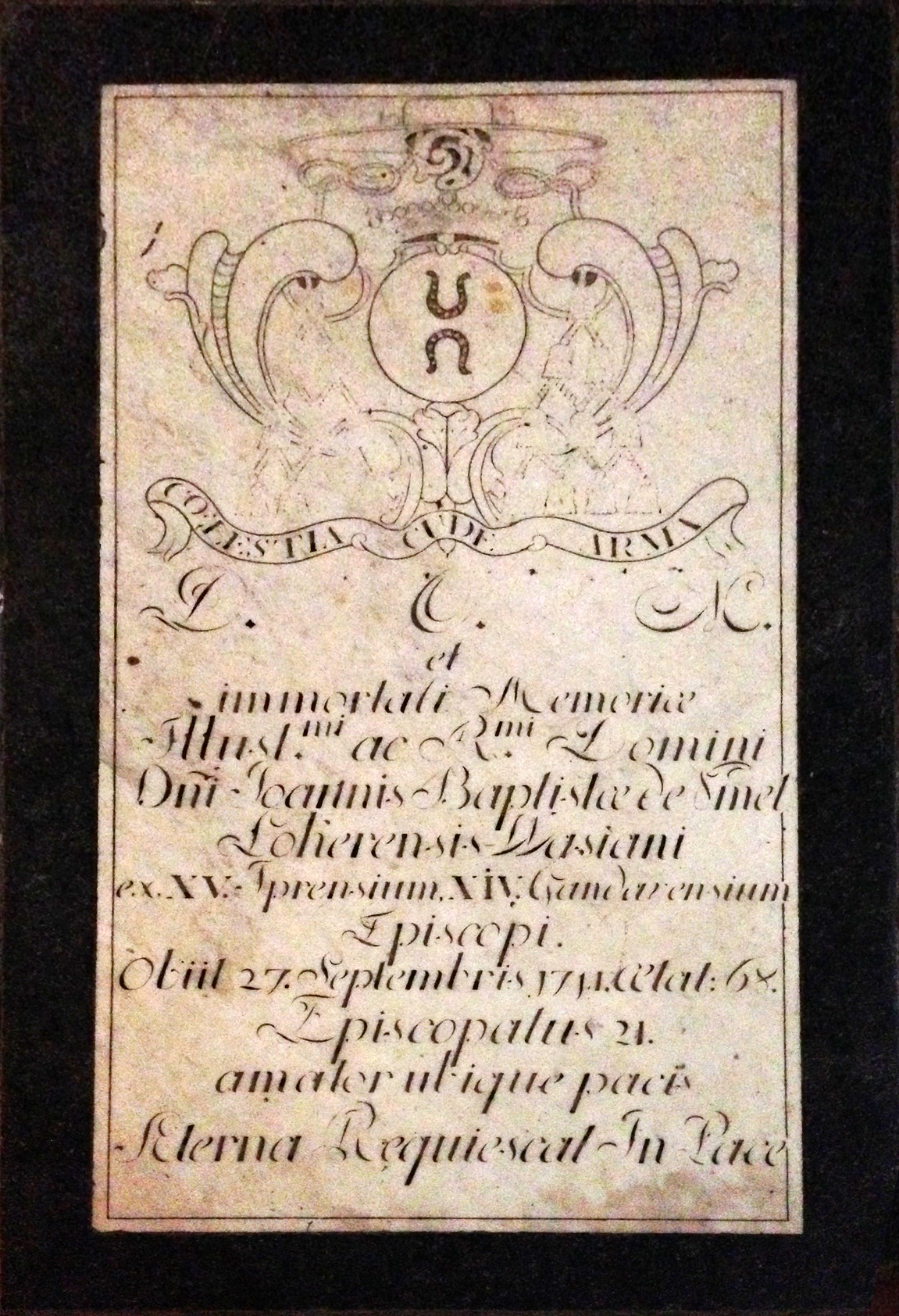
Tomb plaque of Bishop Jan Baptist de Smet

Catholic Church titles
| Preceded by Charles-François-Guy de Montmorency-Laval | Bishop of Ypres; 1721–1732 | Succeeded by Guillaume Delvaux |
| Preceded by Philips Erard van der Noot | Bishop of Ghent; 1732–1741 | Succeeded by Maximiliaan Antoon van der Noot |
