= Louis-Joseph Delebecque =

Belgian theologian and bishop

- Bishop of Ghent
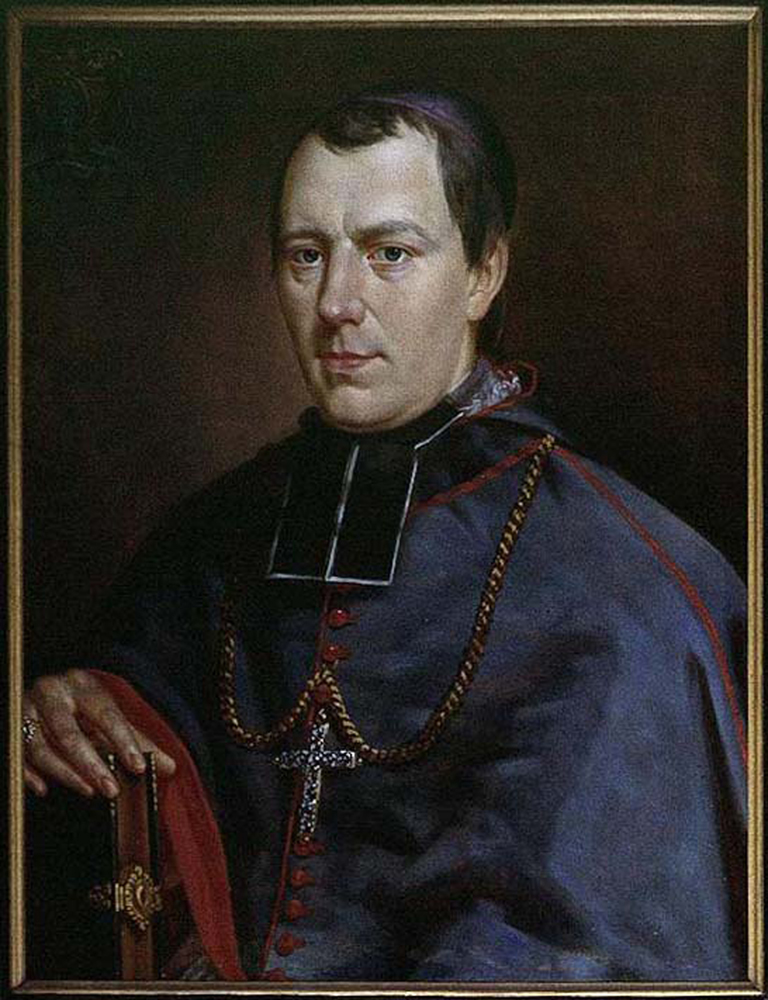
- Province: Mechelen
- Diocese: Ghent
- See: St Bavo's
- Predecessor: Jean-François van de Velde
- Successor: Henricus Franciscus Bracq

Orders
- Consecration: 4 November 1838

Personal details
- Born: 7 December 1798 Warneton, Republic of France
- Died: 2 October 1864 (aged 67) Ghent, East Flanders, Belgium
- Buried: St Bavo's Cathedral, Ghent
- Denomination: Catholic
- Motto: Monstra te esse matrem

Louis-Joseph Delebecque (1796–1864) was the 21st bishop of Ghent, in Belgium, from November 1838 until his death.

== Life ==
Louis-Joseph Delebecque was born in Warneton on 7 December 1798. In 1831 he was appointed professor of dogmatics at the Major Seminary of Ghent, leaving in 1833 to take up a position as secretary to Mgr Franciscus Renatus Boussen, administrator apostolic of West Flanders (and from 1834 bishop of the reconstituted diocese of Bruges). In September 1833 he was appointed president of the Major Seminary, Bruges. Nominated bishop of Ghent on 13 September 1838, he was consecrated on 4 November. On 21 December 1838, he prohibited the clergy of his diocese from any involvement with periodicals disseminating the democratic ideas of Lamennais. This is thought to have had an impact on the outcome of the legislative elections of 1839.

Other measures taken included the setting up of a synodal council for clerical appointments, the drawing up of new statutes for the diocesan clergy and the cathedral chapter, encouraging the establishment of Sunday schools, and the publication of a new edition of the propers of saints of the diocese. In 1839 he founded a normal school in Sint-Niklaas to train primary teachers, and between 1839 and 1862 he founded diocesan secondary schools in eight towns in East Flanders. He became involved in attempts to reform philosophy teaching at the Catholic University of Leuven. In September 1856 he caused consternation with a pastoral letter advising parents against sending their children to the University of Ghent, given its non-Catholic academic climate, and warning against the secular ethos of some secondary schools. The controversy to which this gave rise is thought to have helped the Liberal Party to victory in the 1857 elections. He submitted his resignation in 1858, but was convinced to remain in his position.

He supported the papal promulgation of the dogma of the Immaculate Conception in 1854, and in 1859 reintroduced Peter's Pence in his diocese. He also encouraged lay apostolates for the sick and the poor, as well as for catechesis, and was active in relieving food shortages during the potato blight of 1846–1848.

He died in Ghent on 2 October 1864.

== Honours ==
- Officer of the Order of Leopold, 19 July 1856.

Catholic Church titles
Preceded by Jean-François van de Velde	Bishop of Ghent; 1838–1864	Succeeded by Henricus Franciscus Bracq
