= Belgian Pontifical College =

Coordinates: 41°54′2.646″N 12°25′27.991″E

The Belgian Pontifical College (Dutch: Belgisch Pauselijk College; French: Collège ecclésiastique belge; Italian: Pontificio Collegio Belga) in Rome is a Belgian Catholic educational institution. Founded in 1844, the college is the residence for students sent by the Bishops of the Belgian dioceses to study in Rome.

== History ==
The college was established in 1844 by the Belgian bishops, through the initiative of Aerts, aided by Vincenzo Pecci, the Apostolic Nuncio to Belgium, with the permission and support of Pope Gregory XVI.

At first it was located in the home of Aerts, rector of the Belgian national Church of San Giuliano dei Fiamminghi. In 1845 the ancient monastery of Gioacchino ed Anna at the Quattro Fontane was purchased. The Belgian episcopate supports the students and nominates the rector.

It has been home to many famous residents, in particular the young Karol Wojtyla residing here between 1946 and 1948 together with his friend Gustaaf Joos. During his studies in Rome, Leo Joseph Suenens resided at the college and also served as the college librarian. Another famous resident was Yves Congar.

== Use ==
The college is the residence for students sent by the bishops of the Belgian dioceses to study in Rome. It is also the main residence of the Belgian clergy when in Rome. The students participate in the Clericus Cup.

== Rectors ==
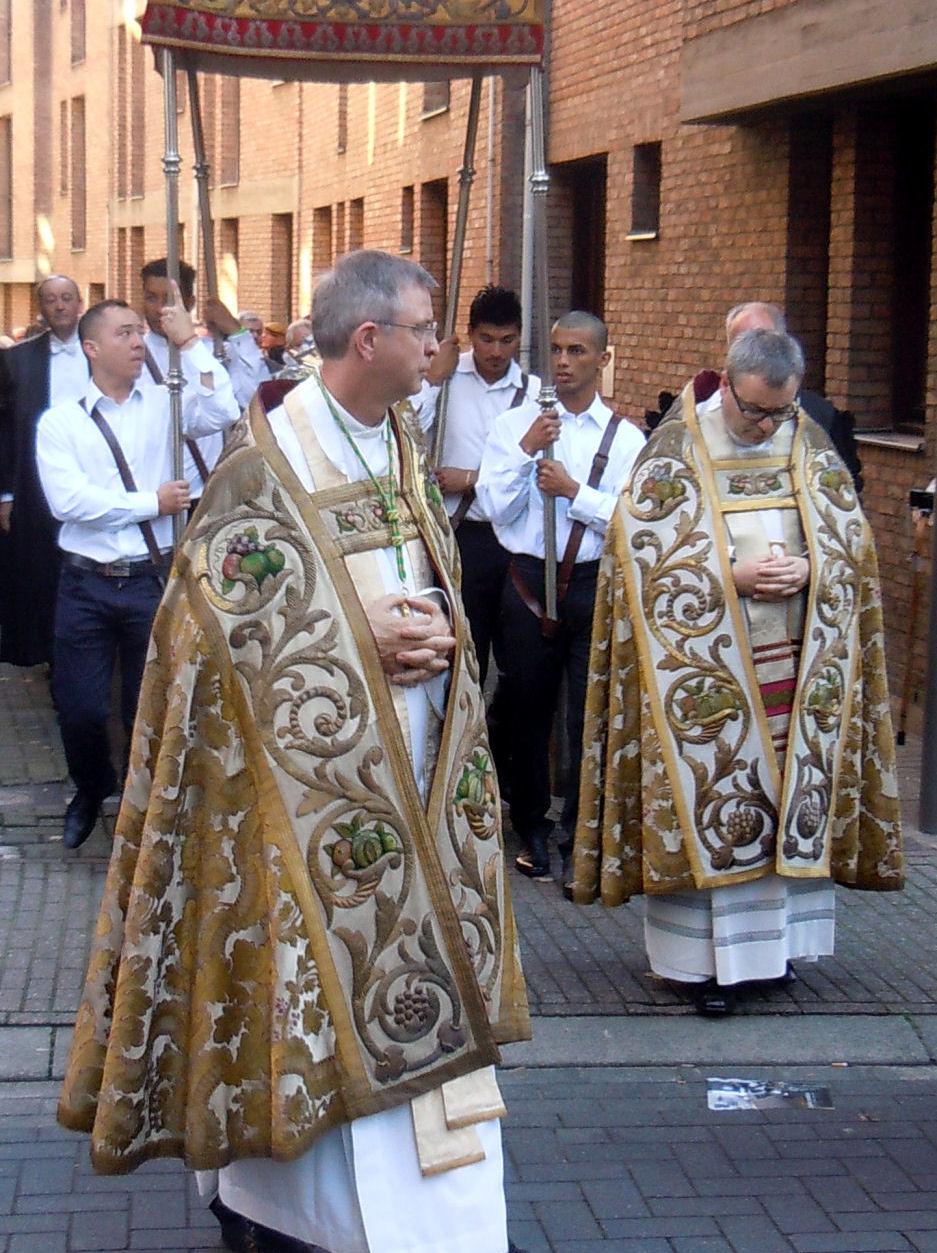
Bonny used to be Rector until his ordination as bishop of Antwerp.

- 1844 - 1854: Pierre-Joseph Aerts, founder and first president
- 1851 - 1854: Jozef Sonneville
- 1854 - 1868: unknown
- 1868 - 1872: Petrus Sacré
- 1872 - 1878: Victor Van den Branden de Reeth
- 1880 - 1927: Charles de t’Serclaes
- 1927 - 1945: Oscar Joliet
- 1946 - 1949: Maximilien de Furstenberg
- 1949 - 1962: Jozef Devroede
- 1962 - 1972: Albert Prignon
- 1972 - 1997: Werner Quintens
- 1997 - 2008: Johan Bonny
- 2009 - 2024: Dirk Smet
- 2024 - incumbent: Geert Morlion

== See also ==
- Roman Colleges
