= Lode Van Hecke =

Belgian Catholic prelate

The Most Reverend Lode Van Hecke OCSO
- Bishop Emeritus of Ghent
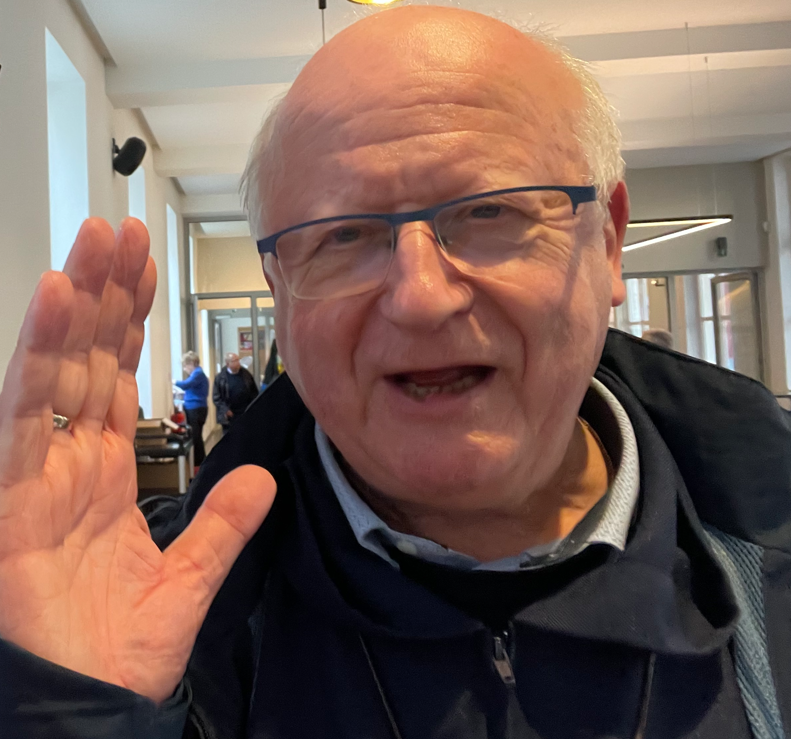
- Church: Roman Catholic Church
- See: Ghent
- Appointed: 27 November 2019
- Installed: 23 February 2020
- Term ended: 30 June 2025
- Predecessor: Lucas Van Looy
- Other post: Abbot of Orval Abbey (2007–2019)

Orders
- Ordination: 20 August 1995
- Consecration: 23 February 2020 by Jozef De Kesel

Personal details
- Born: Lode Van Hecke; 16 March 1950 (age 75) Roeselare, Belgium
- Motto: Latin: Cum Gaudio Spiritus Sancti; In the joy of the Holy Spirit

Styles of Lode Van Hecke
- Reference style: His Excellency; The Most Reverend
- Spoken style: Your Excellency
- Religious style: Bishop

Lode Van Hecke OCSO (born 16 March 1950) is a Belgian Catholic prelate who was Bishop of Ghent from 2019 to 2025. He was abbot of Orval Abbey from 2007 to November 2019. A monk since 1976, he is the only Trappist ever to be appointed bishop of a Belgian diocese.

== Life ==
Van Hecke was born in Roeselare in West Flanders on 16 March 1950. After graduating from secondary school he spent a year at Bruges seminary and then studied philosophy at KU Leuven. He interrupted his studies for military service and became secretary to the head chaplain of the Belgian army. He returned to KU Leuven and earned his licenciate in philosophy with a dissertation on A. N. Whitehead. On 24 September 1976 he entered Orval Abbey and took his final vows as a Trappist on 6 March 1983. He obtained the degree of Licentiate of Sacred Theology from KU Leuven in 1988, with a thesis on Bernard of Clairvaux, and was ordained to the priesthood on 20 August 1995.

At Orval he served as novice master from 1990 to 1998, brewery director from 1998 to 2001, and prior and bursar from 2000 to 2002. He left the Abbey to work as secretary to the Abbot General of the Cistercians in Rome from 2002 to 2004. Returning to Orval, in 2005 he became guestmaster. He was elected Abbot of Orval on 25 January 2007 and installed on 2 June.

Pope Francis appointed him bishop of Ghent on 27 November 2019. He received his episcopal consecration from Jozef De Kesel, Archbishop of Mechelen-Brussels, on 23 February 2020 in a service attended by Queen Paola and representatives of the Muslim and Jewish communities; Trappist beer was served at the reception that followed.

On 16 March 2025, having reached the age of 75, he tendered his resignation as bishop. Pope Leo XIV accepted his resignation on 30 June 2025.

== Writings ==
- Le désir dans l'expérience religieuse. L'homme réunifié. Relecture de saint Bernard. Paris: Cerf. 1990. ISBN 978-2204042109.
- Méditer avec Saint Bernard. Paris: Salvator. 2015. ISBN 978-2706712159.
