= Paul van Imschoot =

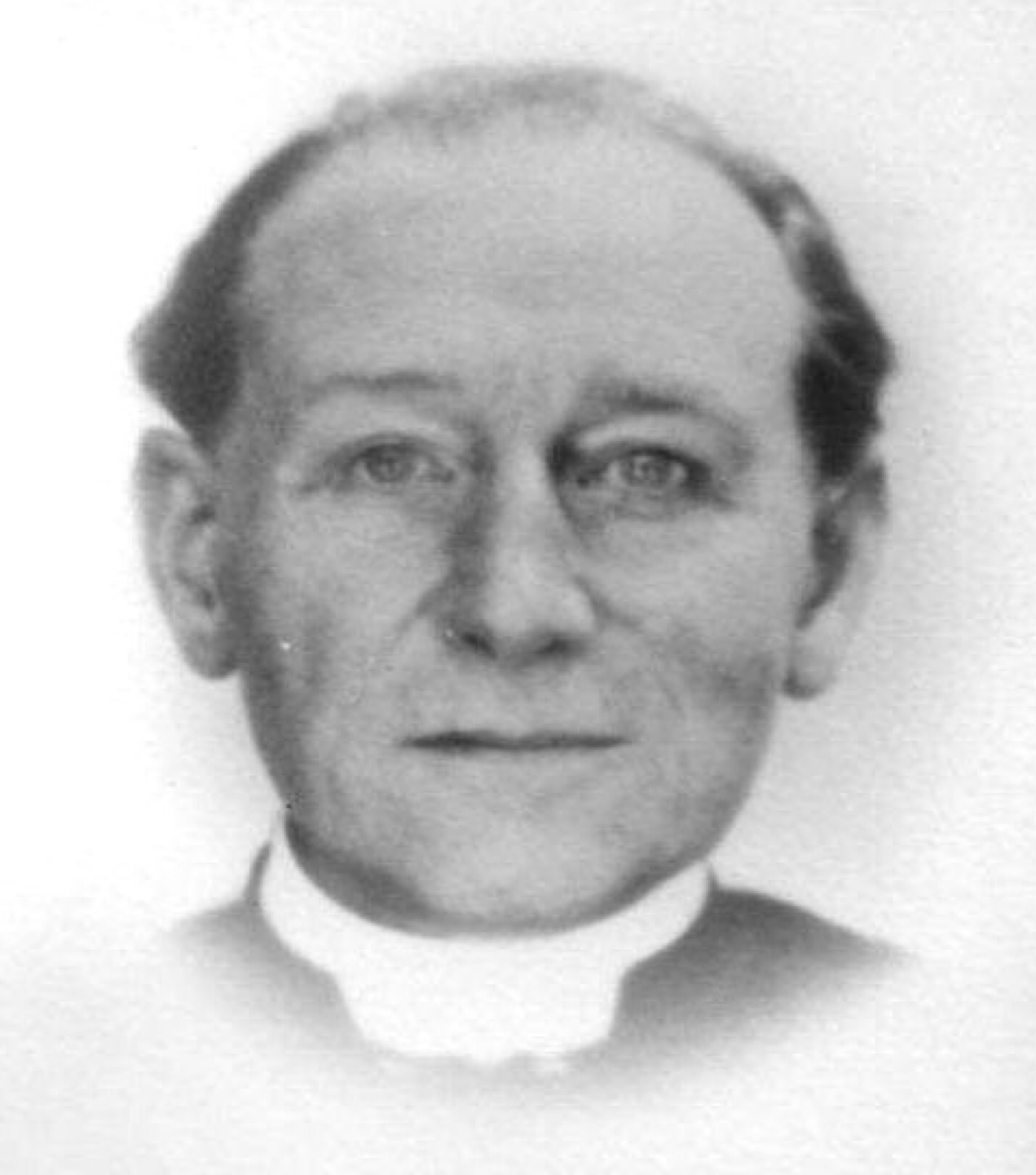
Paul van Imschoot, Belgian Catholic biblical theologian

Paul van Imschoot (17 September 1889 – 25 May 1968; full name Paul Emile Armand Joseph van Imschoot) was a Catholic priest of the Diocese of Ghent and Professor of Exegesis at the seminary of Ghent from 1919–1948. His best-known work is Théologie de l’Ancien Testament (Tournai, 1954–1956), the last Catholic-authored Old Testament theology prior to the Second Vatican Council.

== Scholarship ==
Van Imschoot penned more than 70 essays in Latin and French for the diocesan journal Collationes Gandavenses and over 130 articles in Dutch for the Bijbelsch Woordenboek, an encyclopedic Bible dictionary produced by the Catholic seminary faculties of the Netherlands and Flanders. Following retirement from teaching, van Imschoot was among the early members of the Colloquium Biblicum Lovaniense, an annual meeting of Catholic biblical scholars. He served as the society's president in 1953 and chaired the biblical theology section of the International Catholic Bible Congress, convened in the Vatican pavilion of the 1958 World's Fair in Brussels.

Van Imschoot intended that his magnum opus Théologie de l’Ancien Testament encompass three volumes, but he only completed the first, Tome I: Dieu (also available in English translation) and the second, Tome II: L’Homme. Despite van Imschoot's notoriety in Catholic circles during his lifetime, the dual influences of systematic theology and Neo-Scholastic Thomism upon his work likely limited its reception within the broader academic field of biblical theology.

== Bibliography ==
- Paul van Imschoot, Théologie de l’Ancien Testament, 2 vols., Desclée, 1954–1956.
- Paul van Imschoot, Jesus Christus, Romen, 1941.
- Adrianus van den Born, et al., Bijbelsch Woordenboek, Romen, 1941.
