= Temse Bridge =

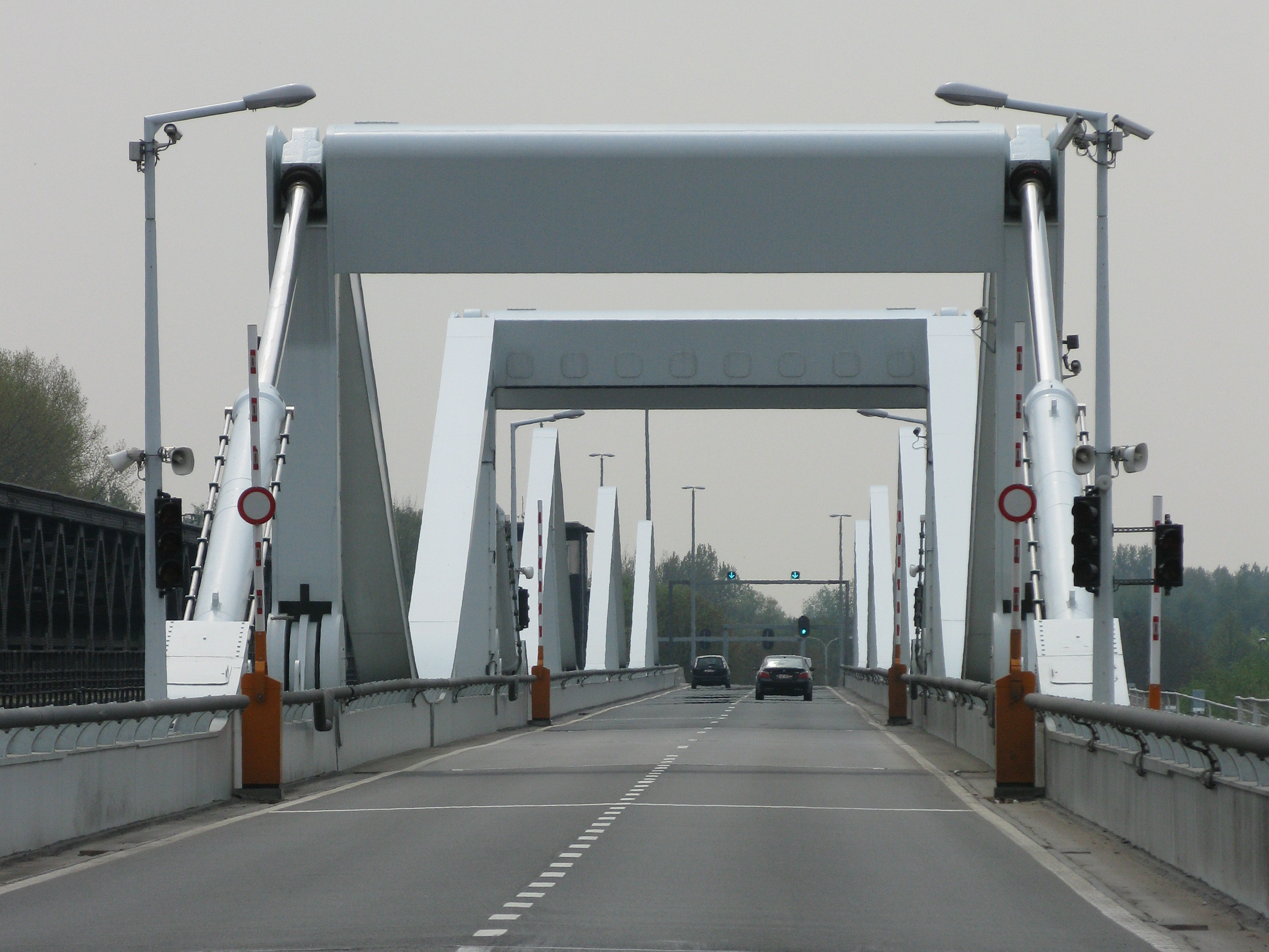
- A parallel Temse bridge was opened in 2009 to ease traffic congestion at busy times.
- Coordinates: 51°7′18″N 4°13′11″E
- Carried: N16 (road bridge since 1955)
- Crossed: Scheldt
- Official name: Temsebrug

Characteristics
- Material: Steel and concrete
- Total length: 343 m (1,125.3 ft) (1870-1940); 365 m (1,197.5 ft) (since 1955); 374 m (1,227.0 ft) (parallel road bridge since 2009)

History
- Construction end: 1870 (rail bridge with adjacent pedestrian toll paths); 1955 (road bridge)
- Collapsed: 1914, 1918, 1940 (blown up by troops)

The Temse Bridge crosses the Scheldt at Temse, a small town approximately 25 km (15 miles) southwest of Antwerp. Between 1955 and 2009 the 365 m (1,197.5 ft) bridge was the longest in Belgium. The old bridge lost that distinction to the New Schelde Bridge which runs parallel to it, and has a length of 374 m (1,227.0 ft).

Temse marks the last bridge crossing over the Scheldt before the river reaches the sea. Road crossings downstream of this point use tunnels.

== Geography ==
The Temse Bridge is a road bridge, connecting Temse on the north shore of the river with Bornem, five minutes by car or bike to the south. The bridge is part of the road numbered N16, which runs from Sint-Niklaas to Mechelen. On the river's south shore the bridge passes over soft land, while the municipal boundary dividing the area administered by Temse in East Flanders from that administered by Bornem in the Province of Antwerp runs along the middle of the river. This means that more than 50% of the bridge's total length falls within the municipality of Bornem.

== History ==
=== Ferry ===
Before there was any bridge, at least as far back as the fourteenth century, there was a ferry crossing point at Temse.

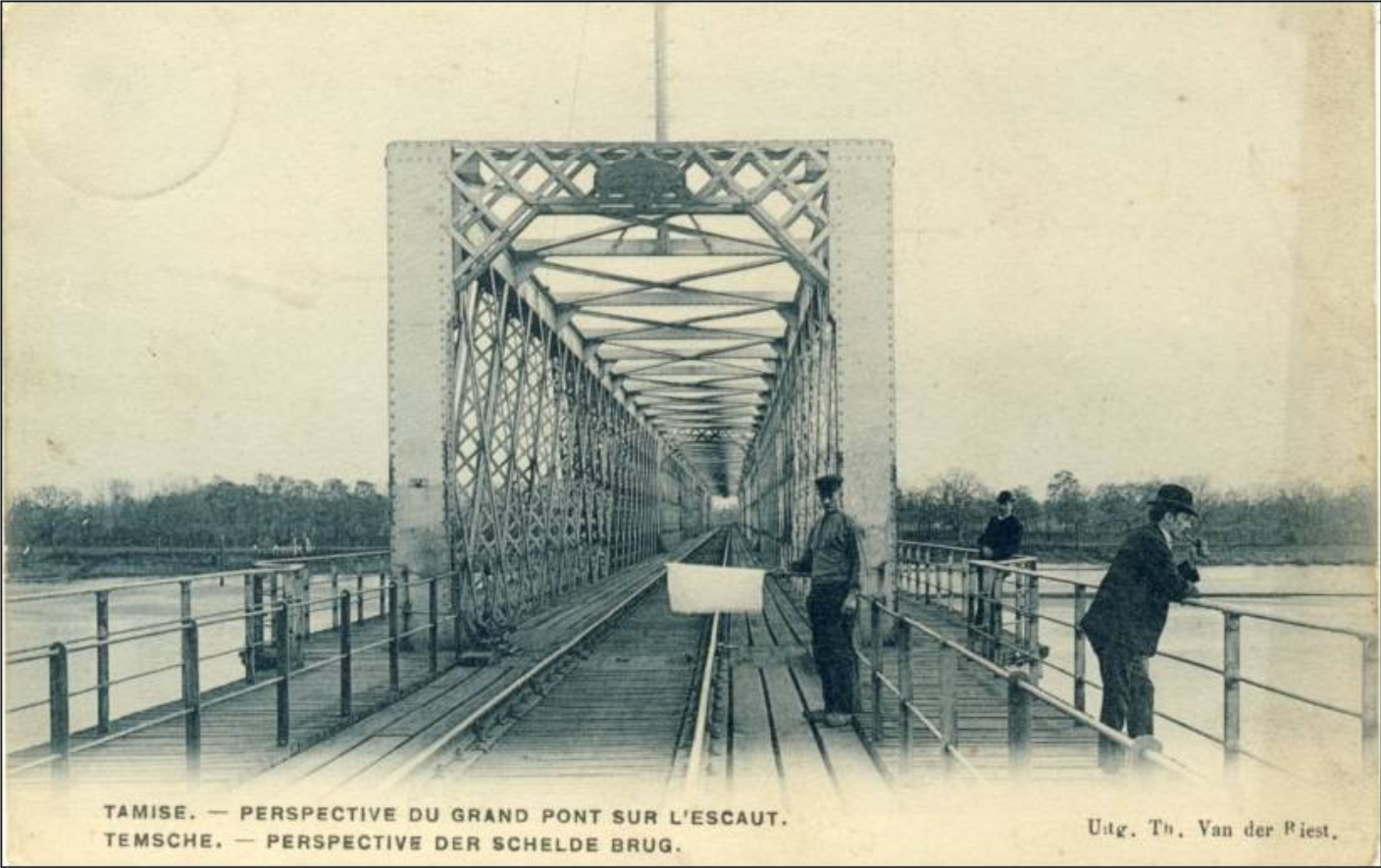
The bridge between 1870 and 1940 was a rail bridge, with parallel toll paths on each side.

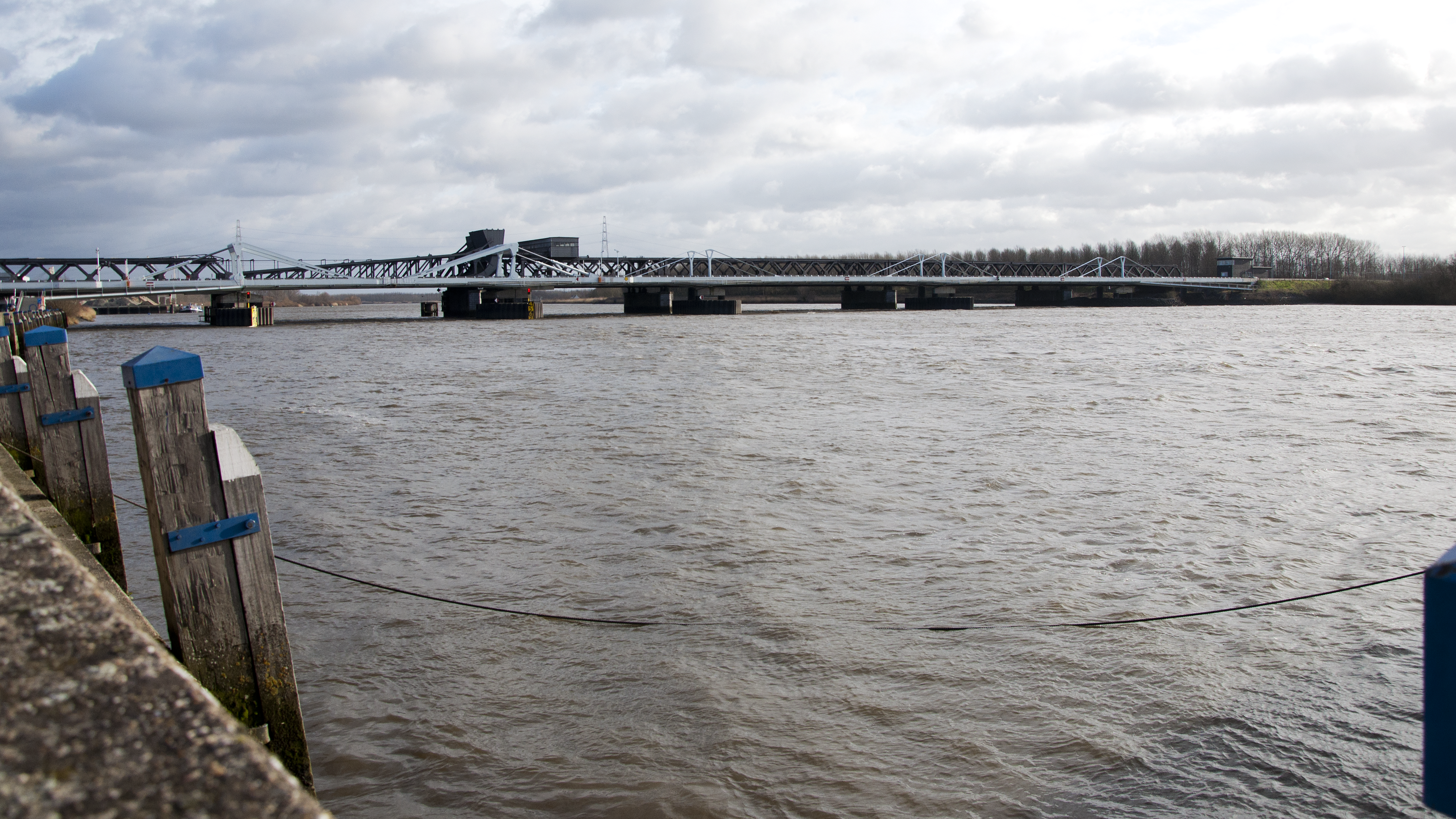
The "New" (2009) Temse bridge viewed from the west in 2012. The "lattice-work" of the steel frame of the "Old" (1955) Temse bridge can be discerned on the far side of it.

=== Rail bridge with toll paths 1870-1940 ===
The first bridge across the Schelde at Temse was ready for use on 30 November 1870. It was designed by the French engineer Gustave Eiffel. Eiffel's 343 m (1,125.3 ft) bridge was primarily a railway bridge, carrying the line from Mechelen to Terneuzen. However, beside the railway line, on each side of it, was a toll path for pedestrians and their animals. Tolls were set in 1872 at 15 centimes for a horse or cow, 10 centimes for a donkey, 5 centimes for a person and 3 centimes for one goat or two ducks. Later in the century, the bridge was also used by small horse carts and dog carts. Towards the end of the century motor cars began to appear on the streets, but anyone wishing to cross the river with a car had to drive upstream to Dendermonde.

The bridge was badly damaged in the First World War, when retreating Belgian troops rendered it unusable in October 1914, but it was restored by the Germans. However, in 1918 it was retreating German troops who rendered the bridge unusable. It was patched together in 1919, but was only restored sufficiently to permit a return to large-scale railway use in March 1924.

The two decades between the wars marked a period of economic growth, notably for the Boel shipyard, a major employer in the little town. The owner of the family business, Frans Boel, was elected mayor of Temse in 1933, and he arrived in office with big plans for the bridge. The bridge already had an opening to facilitate navigability upriver, and Boel's proposals included increasing this so that the shipyard could make larger ships without having to take account of size restrictions imposed by the bridge. The 1930s also saw a surge in car ownership, and there were plans to extend the bridge in ways that would permit cars to use it. A little later, there was also a plan for a completely new bridge a short distance upriver (and upriver of the shipyard). The outbreak of war and the German invasion of Belgium in May 1940 put an end to these plans, however.

On 18 May 1940 the Temse bridge was blown up by French and Belgian troops for tactical reasons. Between 1940 and 1955 river crossings were undertaken by ferry.

=== "Old bridge" 1955 to date ===
Work on what is today (2015) known locally as the "old bridge" began on 2 June 1949. Cars were now a priority, and what was now a 365 m (1,197.5 ft) road bridge, featuring space for a single-track rail-line, a regional road and pedestrian/cycle paths opened on 19 December 1955, in a ceremony presided over by the young King and the Bishop of Ghent. There was nevertheless a human cost: many construction workers fell into the water while this bridge was being built and in 1952 one of them, Karel Pepermans, lost his life in this way.

The 1950s was a decade of explosive growth for the shipyard, its focus on ever larger bulk carriers. The bridge design produced in the late 1940s had not anticipated this. It had incorporated a central drawbridge section at the deepest point in the river to accommodate ships up to 30 m (98.4 ft) meters wide. For the 1960s the decision was taken to increase the maximum ship width to 50 m (164.0 ft). This meant installing a lifted-deck section 20 m (65.6 ft) longer than before, but the need for structural modifications was limited because it was now possible to do this without increasing the weight of the lifted section. The Boel shipyard itself undertook the work, and the important upgrade was achieved during 1963 in record time.

A few decades later it was then explained that the growth in volume and weight of traffic had exceeded official expectations, and the heavy moving parts of the drawbridge section needed replacing. This time the bridge was closed to traffic for two years, starting in 1992, with drivers required to divert via the already frequently clogged up routes via Antwerp or Dendermonde. However, at this stage no steps were taken to increase the capacity of the bridge which reopened with one road lane in each direction (along with the single rail track and the cycle/pedestrian paths) on 29 April 1994.

After 1994 traffic volumes continued to increase, and the bridge's notoriety for congestion and delays grew, but the regional government in Brussels turned a deaf ear to increasingly shrill demands for a solution. In the end the regional Minister of Public Works, Kris Peeters took in 2005 the decision to double up the bridge.

=== "New bridge" 2009 to date ===
Options considered and rejected included another Scheldt Tunnel, to be dug at Temse, but this was deemed technically unfeasible. Consideration was also given to fitting an extra lane to the existing bridge, but it was felt that this would not provide sufficient additional road capacity, and it would also involve another prolonged closure of the bridge which brought back memories of the two years of horrendous delays and diversions during the bridge closure of 1992–94. Following the deliberations and planning, a symbolic "first stone" was put in place in October 2006 and work on a new parallel bridge started in earnest in April 2007.

Unlike the "Old bridge", the 2009 Schelde Bridge carries no rail-track. It does carry two additional road lanes, providing two lanes for southbound traffic, and enabling both vehicle lanes on the 1955 bridge to be used for northbound traffic. There is also a cycle path and a broad pedestrian path with a surface of heavy duty timber planking. The cost of what is now Belgium's longest bridge crossing over water was €23.5 Million. This compared with an estimate of €16.0 Million published in 2005.

In addition to the construction of a new bridge and short link roads for it, the 2009 project also included the addition of "impact safeguards" downstream of the old bridge, positioned to protect the two piers supporting the drawbridge section (and behind them the equivalent piers of the new bridge) on the seaward side.
