= San Pier Damiani ai Monti di San Paolo =

- Church of Saint Peter Damian on Saint Paul's Mountains
- Chiesa di San Pier Damiani ai Monti di San Paolo
- Location within Rome Location within Lazio
- 41°47′16″N 12°22′47″E
- Location: Via Guido Biagi 16, Z. Acilia Sud, Municipio X, Rome
- Country: Italy
- Language: Italian
- Denomination: Catholic
- Tradition: Roman Rite
- Website: www.parrocchie.it/roma/sanpierdamiani/

History
- Status: titular church
- Dedication: Peter Damian
- Consecrated: 1970; reconsecrated 8 March 2002

Architecture
- Functional status: active
- Architect(s): Attilio Spaccarelli, Roberto Panella
- Architectural type: Modern
- Groundbreaking: 1966
- Completed: 1970

Administration
- Diocese: Rome

San Pier Damiani ai Monti di San Paolo is a 20th-century parochial church and titular church in the southwest suburbs of Rome, dedicated to the 11th-century saint Peter Damian.

== History ==
San Pier Damiani was built in 1966–70.

On 5 March 1973, it was made a titular church to be held by a cardinal-deacon. The church was poorly constructed, and had to be rebuilt in 1998–2002. Pope Francis visited in 2017.

Cardinal-Protectors

- Pietro Palazzini (1973–1974)
- Gustaaf Joos (2003–2004)
- Agostino Vallini (2006–present); promoted to cardinal-priest pro hac vice in 2009
