= Albert de Hornes =

Bishop of Ghent and nobleman

- Bishop of Ghent
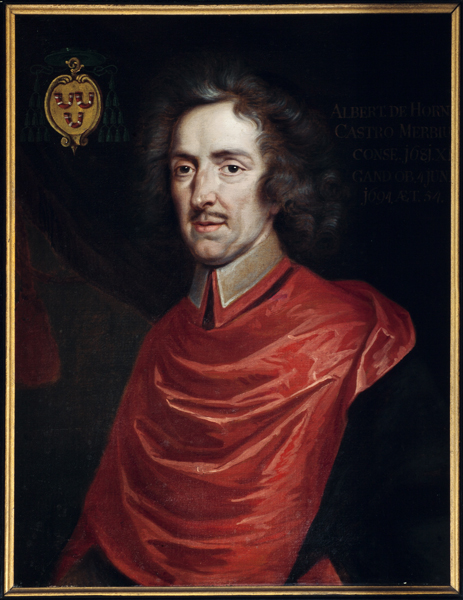
- Church: Roman Catholic Church
- Diocese: Diocese of Ghent
- Installed: 10 September 1680
- Term ended: 4 June 1694
- Predecessor: Ignace Schetz de Grobbendonk
- Successor: Philips Erard van der Noot

Orders
- Consecration: 22 June 1681

Personal details
- Born: 25 February 1642 Braine-le-Château, Southern Netherlands
- Died: 4 June 1694 (aged 52) Ghent, Southern Netherlands
- Denomination: Catholicism
- Education: University of Louvain Douai University
- Motto: Lex tua meditatio mea est

Albert de Hornes was a prelate of the Southern Netherlands, born on 25 February 1642 in Braine-le-Château. He died on 4 June 1694 in Ghent.

== Biography ==
Albert François de Hornes is the son of Count Philippe Lamoral de Horne (1602-1654 or 1663) and Dorothea de Ligne-Arenberg (1601-1665).

After his humanities at the Jesuit College of Halle (then county of Hainaut, present-day Flemish Brabant), he attended the University of Louvain and the Douai University of the Spanish Netherlands, where he obtained a master's degree in law in 1665 and a baccalaureate canon of theology in 1667.

From 1667 to 1672, he enjoyed a canonical prebend at the Saint-Pierre Chapter of Leuze-en-Hainaut. He was ordained a priest on 5 April 1670.

On 5 November 1672 he was appointed Provost of the Saint-Bavon Chapter in Ghent. In this capacity, he was elected Vicar General sede vacante three times: from 1673 to 1677 after the death of Eugène Albert d'Allamont, in 1679 after the death of Frans de Horenbeke, and in 1680 after the death of Bishop Ignace Schetz de Grobbendonk.

== Episcopal career ==
Beginning in 1675 Albert de Hornes was regularly named as a potential candidate for a vacant diocese in the ecclesiastical provinces of Mechelen and Cambrai.

On 10 September 1680 King Charles II of Spain appointed him Bishop of Ghent, succeeding Ignace Schetz de Grobbendonk. On 13 January 1681 this appointment was confirmed by Pope Innocent XI.

On 22 June 1681 he was consecrated Bishop of Ghent under the motto Lex tua meditatio mea est (motto taken from the Book of Psalms, in Latin Liber Psalmorum, 118-92: Nisi quod lex tua meditatio mea est tunc forte perissem in humilitate mea: If I had not meditated on Your law, I would perhaps have perished in my humiliation). He was only 39 years old at the time.

Under his administration, the archives of the Episcopal Seminary of Ghent were organized and included in an inventory for the first time.

He died at a relatively young age (52) on 4 June 1694. Nevertheless, he had already been a bishop for 13 years. Like his predecessor, he wanted an austere burial, and his remains were placed in the crypt of Saint Bavo's Cathedral.

== Bibliography ==
Albrecht van Horne (1642-1694): Albertus Dei & apostolicæ sedis gratia episcopus Gandavensis [...] salutem in Domino. Cupientes quantum in nobis est omni indebito sacro-sancti missæ sacrificij exercitio occurrere. Ghent, 1692
