= Maurice-Jean de Broglie =

French aristocrat and bishop

His Grace and Excellency Maurice-Jean, Prince de Broglie
- Bishop of Ghent
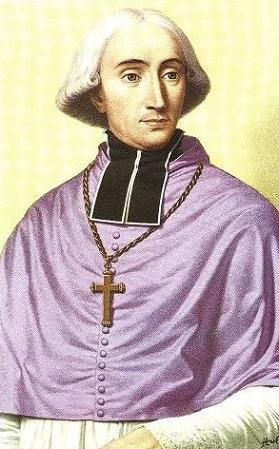
- Diocese: Ghent
- See: St Bavo's
- Previous post: bishop of Acqui

Personal details
- Born: 5 September 1766
- Died: 20 June 1821 (aged 54) Paris, Kingdom of France
- Buried: St Bavo's Cathedral, Ghent
- Parents: Victor-Francois, Duc de Broglie
- Education: canon and civil law

Maurice-Jean Madeleine de Broglie (Broglie, Eure, 5 September 1766 – 20 June 1821, Paris) was a French aristocrat and bishop. He was the son of Marshal of France Victor-Francois, Duc de Broglie, created, by Emperor Francis I, Prince of the Holy Roman Empire, a title which was to be hereditary in the family.

== Career ==
Intending to become a priest, Maurice pursued his studies at St.-Sulpice. During the Reign of Terror, when they were driven out of France, he and his father went to Berlin. King Frederick William II of Prussia received the duke with marked distinction and granted to the young prince a provostship in the cathedral chapter of Posen.

Maurice returned to France in 1803, and the steps he took to recover some family property not yet sold brought him to the attention of Napoleon, who invited him to his court and named him his almoner. De Broglie became a follower of the monarch and eulogized him in a pastoral letter issued on the occasion of the victory at the battle of Austerlitz. In 1805 Napoleon nominated him to the See of Acqui, Italy, and in 1807 appointed him Bishop of Ghent, Belgium.

== Bishop of Ghent ==
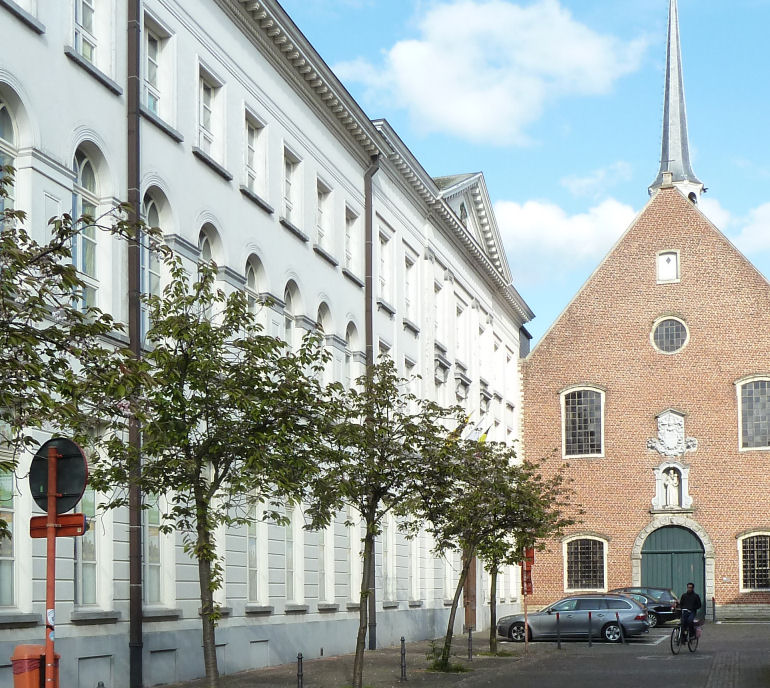
The St. Joseph Minor Seminary in Sint-Niklaas, erected by de Broglie

Later, de Broglie showed determined opposition to Napoleon. In 1809, the minister of worship wrote in a letter that the sovereign was highly displeased with the bishop because of his lack of devotion to the royal person; in 1810, the bishop refused the Cross of the Legion of Honor, sent to him by the emperor, since the reckoned that he could not accept such a distinction at the time when the Papal States had been seized, and he explained his refusal in a memoir sent to the minister.

By an order of Napoleon, a council was assembled in Paris, on 17 June 1811, under the presidency of Cardinal Fesch, uncle of the emperor and Archbishop of Lyon. The object of Napoleon was to oblige the pope to grant the Bulls of institution to the priests nominated by him to bishoprics, but Pope Pius VII had firmly refused.

The fathers of the council solemnly assembled in the metropolitan church, there being present six cardinals, nine archbishops, and eighty bishops; this was the first and the last general session. After six preliminary particular sessions, a decree in compliance with the will of Napoleon was proposed to the bishops. At first only two, d'Aviau, Archbishop of Bordeaux, and de Broglie, Bishop of Ghent, rejected it; but subsequently, only four members were for the pure and simple acceptance of the decree. The pope had privately declared that such encroachments on his spiritual power were contrary to the laws of the Church and ecclesiastical discipline.

Napoleon prorogued the council and visited with severe punishments the bishops who had been most prominent in their opposition. Arrested on 12 July 1811, de Broglie was cast into the dungeon at Vincennes and kept in close confinement for more than four months, without outside communication, and without books or writing materials. He was next sent as an exile to Beaune. On the mere suspicion that he had intercourse with his clergy, he was deported to the Île Sainte-Marguerite on the coast of Provence. De Broglie while in prison signed, under compulsion, his resignation as Bishop of Ghent. Although it was not accepted by the pope and was consequently null, Napoleon named a successor to the see.

After the fall of Napoleon, de Broglie returned to his diocese. The allied sovereigns of Europe after the overthrow of Napoleon had formed the Netherlands and Belgium, or the Low Countries, into the United Kingdom of the Netherlands and appointed William of Nassau to rule over it. The plenipotentiaries of the powers, assembled in London, 1814, made the Dutch Constitution the fundamental law of Belgium, with a proviso that it should be modified according to circumstances. On 18 July 1815, William proposed the Dutch Constitution to the Belgians, and the representatives summoned to vote upon it rejected it by 796 to 527. The king, disregarding the vote, imposed upon the Belgians a constitution that deprived the catholic clergy of their privileges.

De Broglie with the Bishop of Namur and Bishop of Tournai and the Vicars-General of Mechlin and Liège took the lead in the protest and issued a pastoral instruction and, later on, a doctrinal judgment on the required oath to the Constitution. De Broglie also appealed to Pius VII, and the pontiff, on 16 May 1816, sent an official note to the minister of the Low Countries residing in Rome, stating that the Belgian Constitution contained statements contrary to Catholicism, that the opposition of the bishops could not in justice be reproved, and that no oath opposed to conscience should be imposed. New difficulties then arose, first when the bishop refused to offer public prayers for the king, and again, when at the erection of new universities, de Broglie addressed a representation to the king in which he pointed out the introduction of dangerous books into public institutions and strongly expressed his fears for the fate of the episcopal seminaries.

Cited before the tribunal, he took refuge in France, and the court of Brussels by a judgment, 8 November 1817, condemned him to deportation. The sentence was posted by the public executioner between the sentences of two public malefactors.

In 1819, de Broglie printed a protest concerning the state of religious affairs in Belgium, which was addressed to the Emperors of Austria and Russia and to the King of Prussia.

Catholic Church titles
Preceded by Stephane-Andreas de Paula Fallot de Beaumont	19th Bishop of Ghent; 1814-1821	Succeeded by Jean-François van de Velde
