= Pietro Palazzini =

20th-century Italian Catholic cardinal

His Eminence Pietro Palazzini
- Cardinal, Prefect emertius of the Congregation for the Causes of Saints
- Church: Catholic Church
- Installed: 27 June 1980
- Term ended: 1988
- Predecessor: Corrado Bafile
- Successor: Angelo Felici
- Other post: Cardinal-Priest of San Girolamo della Carità
- Previous posts: Prefect of the Congregation for the Causes of Saints (1980–1988); Titular Archbishop of Caesarea in Cappadocia (1962–1973); Cardinal-Deacon of San Pier Damiani ai Monti di San Paolo (1973–1974)

Orders
- Ordination: 6 December 1934
- Consecration: 21 September 1962 by John XXIII
- Created cardinal: 5 March 1973 by Paul VI
- Rank: Cardinal-deacon (1973-1974) Cardinal-priest (1974-2000)

Personal details
- Born: Pietro Palazzini; 19 May 1912 Piobbico, near Pesaro, Kingdom of Italy
- Died: 11 October 2000 (aged 88) Rome, Italy

Pietro Palazzini (19 May 1912 – 11 October 2000) was an Italian cardinal, who helped to save the lives of Jews in World War II. He was consecrated bishop by the pope in 1962 and was elevated to the cardinalate in 1973. He has been commemorated by Yad Vashem. From 1980 to 1988, Cardinal Palazzini was Prefect of the Congregation for the Causes of Saints.

== Life ==
Born in Piobbico, near Pesaro, on 19 May 1912, of a humble family, Palazzini studied at the Pontifical Regional Seminary in the coastal town of Fano. In 1932, he took a degree in Law at the Lateran University in Rome. He was ordained a priest in 1934 and returned to the Lateran University to continue his studies in Theology. Palazzini began his career teaching moral theology and canon law in Rome.

== World War II ==
After various teaching assignments, Palazzini was assistant vice-rector of the Pontifical Major Roman Seminary, located on the grounds of the Basilica of St. John Lateran. Although Palazzini was under surveillance by Italian Fascists who suspected him of harboring Jews, he, together with Father Vincenzo Fagiolo, hid Jews at the Lateran.

In 1985, Palazzini was honored by Yad Vashem as "Righteous Among the Nations", where he protested the repeated criticisms against Pope Pius XII, on whose instructions Palazzini declared himself to have acted. Palazzini, a theological advisor to the Pontiff, had taught and written about the moral theology of Pope Pius XII.

In a 1992 interview, Palazzini referred to a walk he took with Pius XII in the Vatican Gardens before the imminent Nazi occupation of Rome, during which, it was rumoured, the Pope could be abducted. Behind the bushes, on the walkways, everywhere, there were marching exercises by the soldiers of the Papal Noble Guard. When the Pope asked the meaning of them, he was told that they were exercises in preparation for his defense, in case of a German take-over of the Vatican. However, on the day of the German occupation of the Eternal City, the Papal Noble Guard had disappeared. Only the Swiss guard stood watch at the Vatican. Pope Pius XII, Palazzini stated, would not have left the Vatican as Pope in case of a Nazi abduction. He would have resigned and left as a simple priest.

== Postwar career ==
In the early 1950s, Palazzini was appointed vice-rector of the Pontifical Roman Academy for Juridical Studies. In 1958, he founded the magazine Studi Cattolici. Also in 1958, Palazzini was appointed secretary to the Congregation of the Council.

Palazzini was made titular Archbishop of Caesarea in Cappadocia by Pope John XXIII in 1962 and was among those chosen to assist with preparations for the Second Vatican Council. In 1961, he was made a consultor on the commission for the interpretation of canon law. Palazzini wrote a number of articles and books on the subject.

=== Palazzini and the Dutch Catechism ===
An eminent moral theologian, Palazzini was appointed by Pope Paul VI to serve as coordinator and secretary of a commission of high-ranking cardinals to review a progressivist and liberal leaning catechism which was issued by the Catholic Bishops Conference of the Netherlands and was commonly referred to as the "Dutch Catechism". It was "a work which on the one hand is marked with exceptional qualities but on the other hand, because of its new opinions, from the very moment of issue disturbed not a few of the faithful." It was translated into over 20 languages and received wide distribution.

On 14 October 1968, Palazzini issued their official views together with Charles Journet, Joseph Frings, Joseph-Charles Lefèbvre, Ermenegildo Florit, Michael Browne, and Lorenz Jäger: Declaration of the Commission of Cardinals on the "New Catechism" ("De Nieuwe Katechismus"). The declaration was not rejected by the Dutch bishops, and, while they did not change the text, they issued the views of the commission in the form of a supplement.

In 1980, Pope John Paul II appointed Palazzini to join the Congregation for the Causes of Saints, which examines candidates for possible canonisation. He took part in streamlining the laborious and lengthy juridical process which had formerly hampered those candidates whose supporters lacked funds and perseverance. The rules improved the cases of ordinary lay people who lacked supporters in religious orders to promote their cause through the Vatican bureaucracy.

Palazzini was a Bailiff Grand Cross of Honor and Devotion of the Sovereign Military Order of Malta.

Palazzini retired in 1988 and spent his later years in Rome, where he died on 11 October 2000.
