= Sint-Barbaracollege =

Coordinates: 51.048767°N 3.724446°E

Location
- Savaanstraat 33; Ghent, Belgium

Information
- Established: October 1833; 192 years ago
- Category: Primary & secondary
- Principal: Guy Dalcq
- Affiliation: Jesuit (Roman Catholic)
- Website: www.sint-barbara.be

Sint-Barbaracollege in Ghent, Belgium, is a public Jesuit school, founded in 1833. It currently includes primary and secondary education.

== History ==
The school is built on the location of a cloister, the "Sint Barbaraklooster in Jerusalem". The cloister was founded in 1420 for Augustinian nuns, closed in 1783 by order of Joseph II, briefly reopened but closed again during the French Revolutionary War. In 1814 the building near the Ketelvest housed a secondary school, but that was closed in 1819 by order of William I who had opened an atheneum in the nearby buildings of the old Baudelo Abbey. In 1833, after the Belgian Revolution of 1830 the Bishop of Ghent, Jan Frans Van De Velde, gave the school to the Jesuits. The first students graduated in 1836. A school church was inaugurated on 6 November 1858.

Maurice Maeterlinck, who was sent there in 1874 (then aged 14) disliked the fact that in Sainte-Barbe works of the French Romantics were scorned and only plays on religious subjects were permitted. His experiences at this school influenced his distaste for the Catholic Church and organized religion.

== Education and values ==
Though located in a Dutch-speaking Flemish city, the language of instruction at Sint-Barbaracollege was French, and as such it was considered in the 19th and early 20th Century as instilling a French cultural identity in its young Flemish pupils – though some of them later rebelled against this identity, such as Joris Van Severen.

As of 2011, the Sint-Barbaracollege consists of K through 12: primary secondary education. Improvements since 2014 made way for a spacious new sports hall. In 2017 the school extended its Wi-Fi capability and increased the number of tablets available to students. There is an active parents' group which raises money for school improvements. The school persists in striving to implement and update the principles of Jesuit pedagogy in dialogue with Christian values as it addresses the challenges of a secularized and globalized society.

== Notable alumni ==
- Karel Justinus Calewaert
- Corneille Heymans
- Charles van Lerberghe
- Maurice Maeterlinck
- Gerard Mortier
- Albert Nyssens (1855-1901)
- Jozef Ostyn
- Georges Rodenbach
- Jacques Rogge, IOC president from 2001-2013
- François van Rysselberghe, scientist (1846-1893)
- Marcel Storme
- Joris van Severen
- Vincent Van Quickenborne
- Emile Verhaeren
- Philippe Herreweghe
- René Jacobs

== See also ==
- List of Jesuit sites in Belgium
- Diocese of Ghent
