= Major Seminary, Ghent =

The Major Seminary in Ghent was an institution for the training of Catholic clergy for the diocese of Ghent, first founded in 1569. It has been established at three different locations in the city. Since 2006 diocesan clergy from Ghent have been trained in Leuven.

== 1569–1623 ==
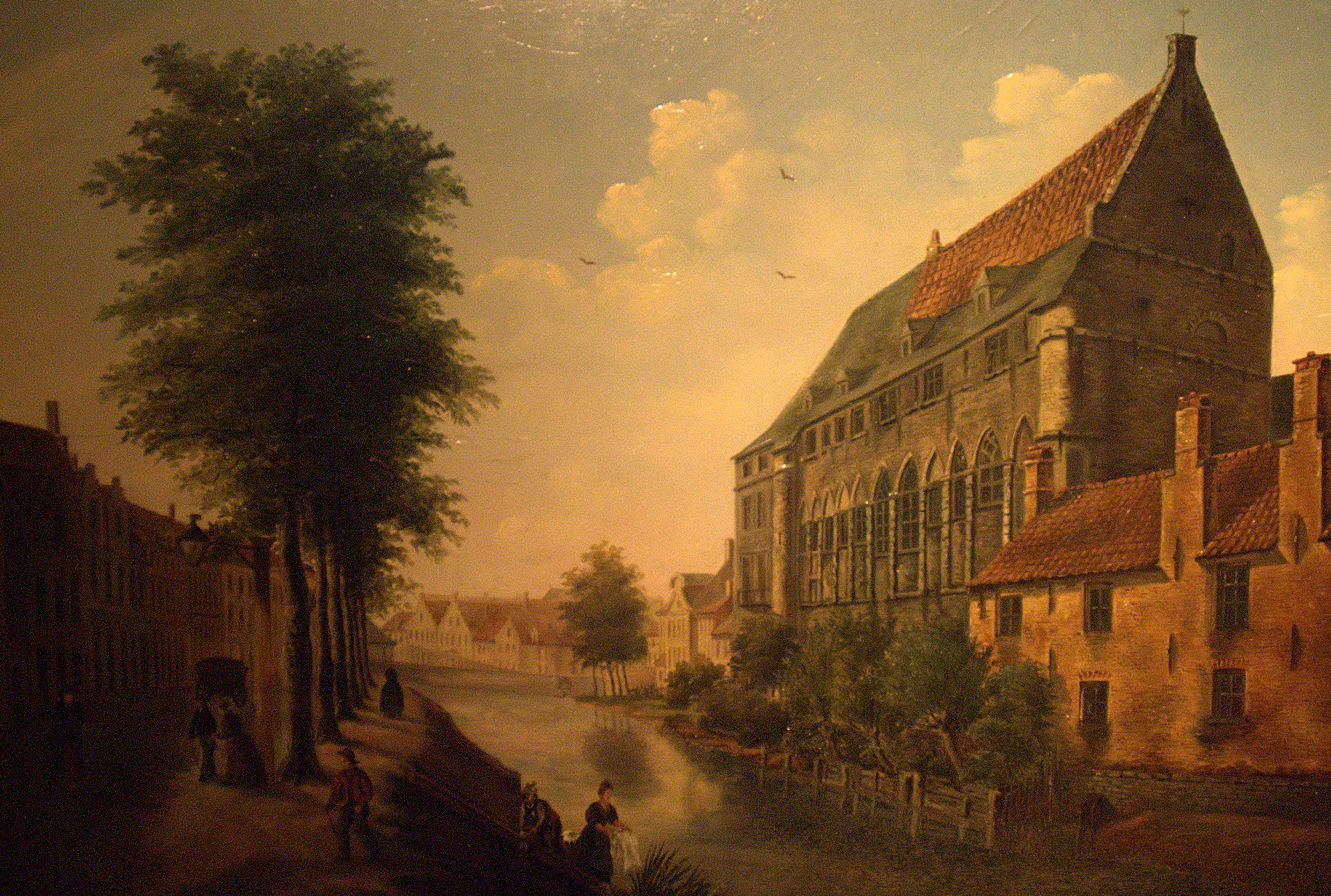
The first location of the seminary

The seminary was founded in the Geeraard de Duivelsteen by Cornelius Jansen, the first bishop of Ghent, in accordance with the decrees of the Council of Trent.

== 1623–1925 ==
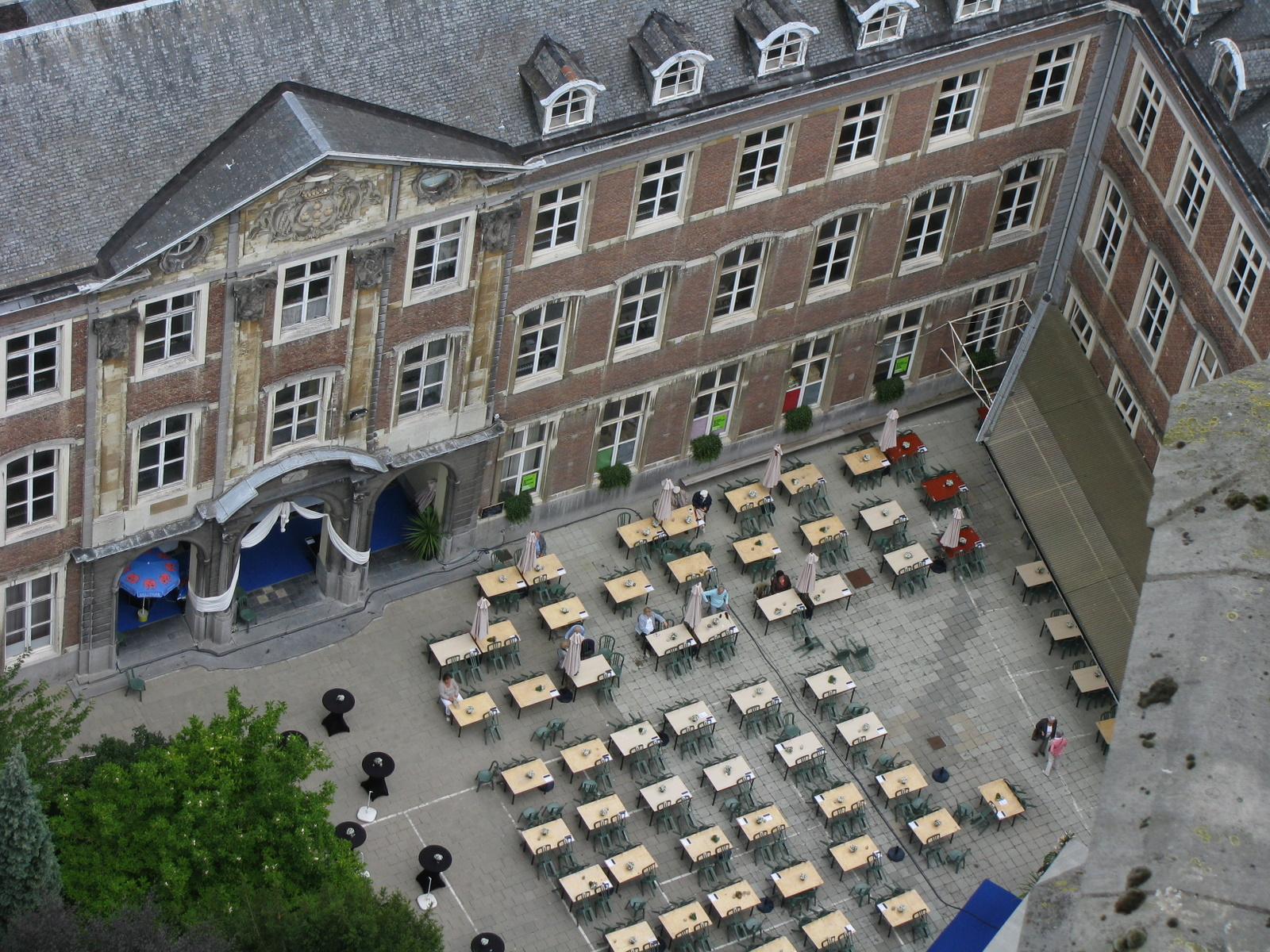
The second location of the seminary

In 1623 Bishop Anthonius Triest acquired a new property on Biezekapelstraat, next to Ghent Cathedral, to house the seminary. This building was heavily renovated and extended in the 18th century, with much of the work commissioned from the architect-contractor David 't Kindt (1699-1770) by Bishop Maximiliaan Van der Noot. With a hiatus between 1797 and 1830, it was in use until 1925. During the French occupation it was in use as a barracks. It has been recognised as built heritage since 2009 and a protected monument since 2013. For much of the 20th century the buildings housed a school. They are now a diocesan activity centre, housing libraries and archives.

== 1925–2002 ==
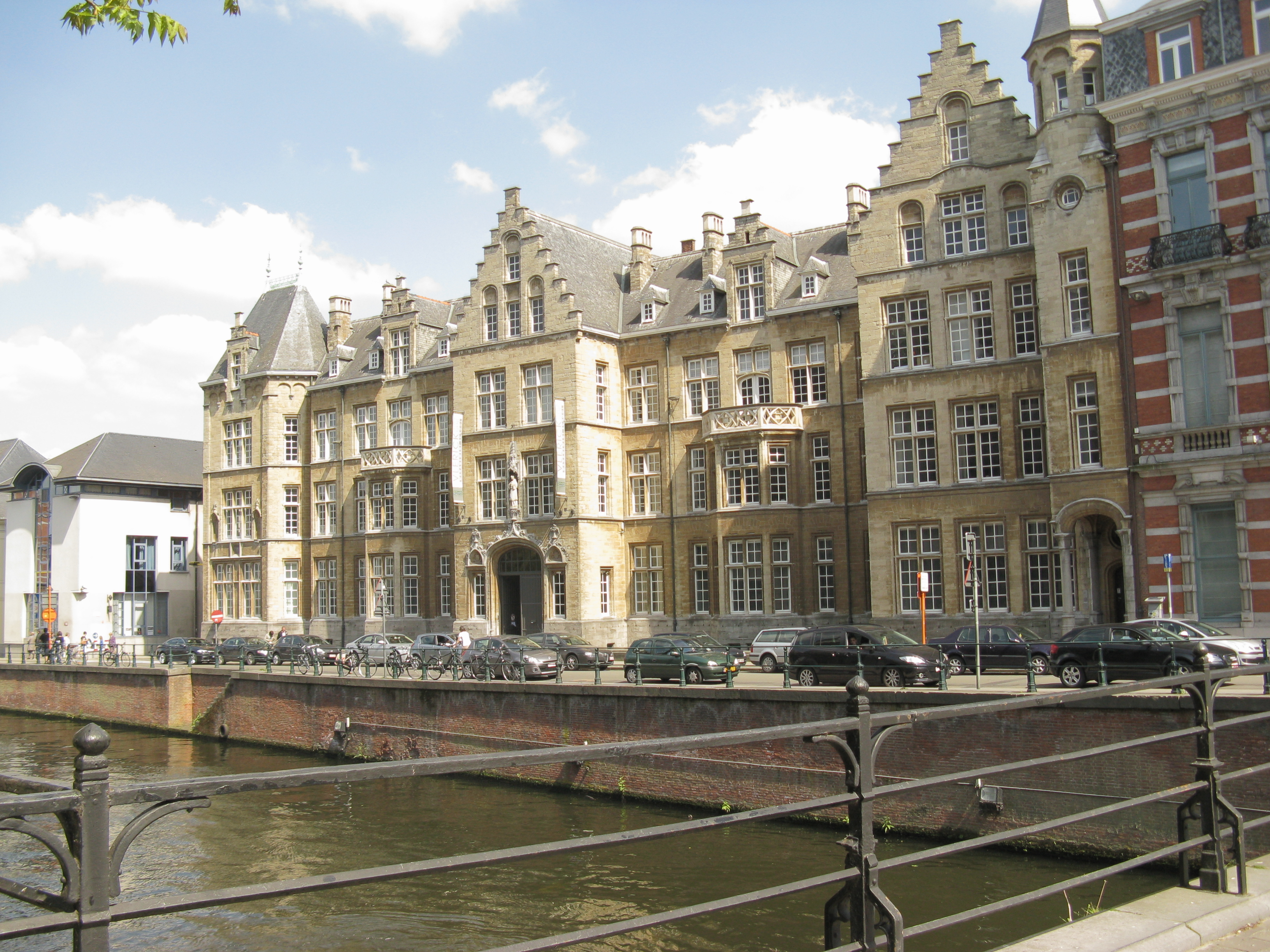
The third location of the seminary

In 1925, the seminary was relocated to a purpose-built neo-traditionalist complex in the Reep. This complex was recognised as built heritage in 2009. Vlerick Business School acquired the use of the buildings in 2002.

== Notable alumni and staff ==
- Henricus Franciscus Bracq
- Jozef De Kesel
- Joseph Jean De Smet
- Louis-Joseph Delebecque
- Henry Gabriels, Belgian-born bishop of Ogdensburg, New York (1838-1921)
- Edward Poppe
- Jan Roegiers
- Antoon Stillemans
