= Diocese of Ghent =

Catholic ecclesiastical territory in Belgium

Diocese of Ghent Dioecesis Gandavensis Bisdom Gent (Dutch) Diocèse de Gand (French) Bistum Gent (German)

Catholic
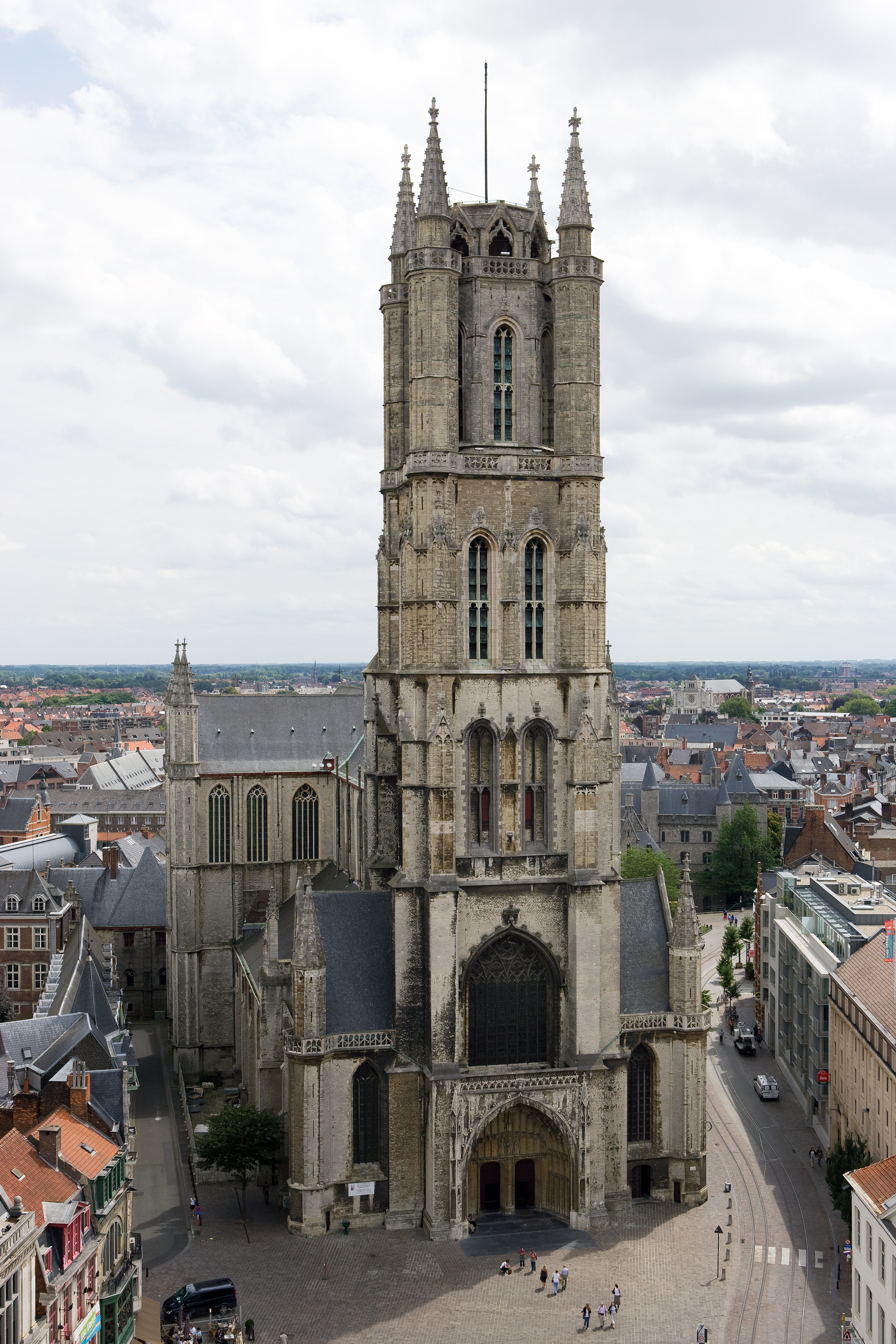
- St. Bavo's Cathedral in Ghent

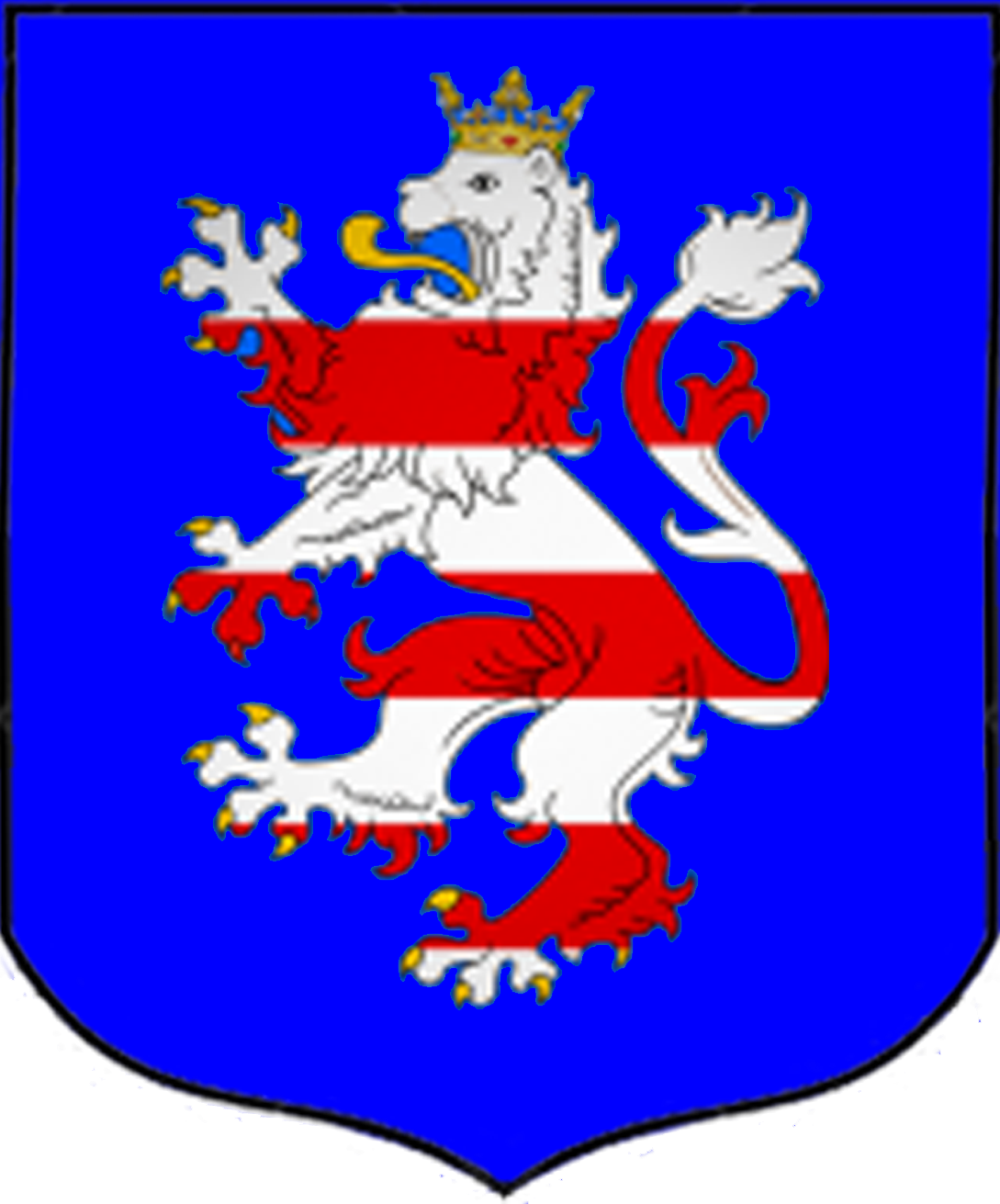
- Coat of arms

Location
- Country: Belgium
- Ecclesiastical province: Mechelen-Brussels
- Metropolitan: Archdiocese of Mechelen-Brussels
- Coordinates: 51°03′10″N 3°43′43″E

Statistics
- Area: 2,995 km^{2} (1,156 sq mi)
- Population: Total; Catholics: (as of 2021); 1,539,800; 1,088,100 (70.7%)

Information
- Denomination: Catholic Church
- Sui iuris church: Latin Church
- Rite: Roman Rite
- Established: 12 May 1559
- Cathedral: St. Bavo's Cathedral in Ghent

Current leadership
- Pope: Leo XIV
- Bishop: Vacant
- Metropolitan Archbishop: Luc Terlinden
- Bishops emeritus: Arthur Luysterman (1991–2003); Lucas Van Looy, SDB (2004–2019); Lode Van Hecke, O.C.S.O.

Map
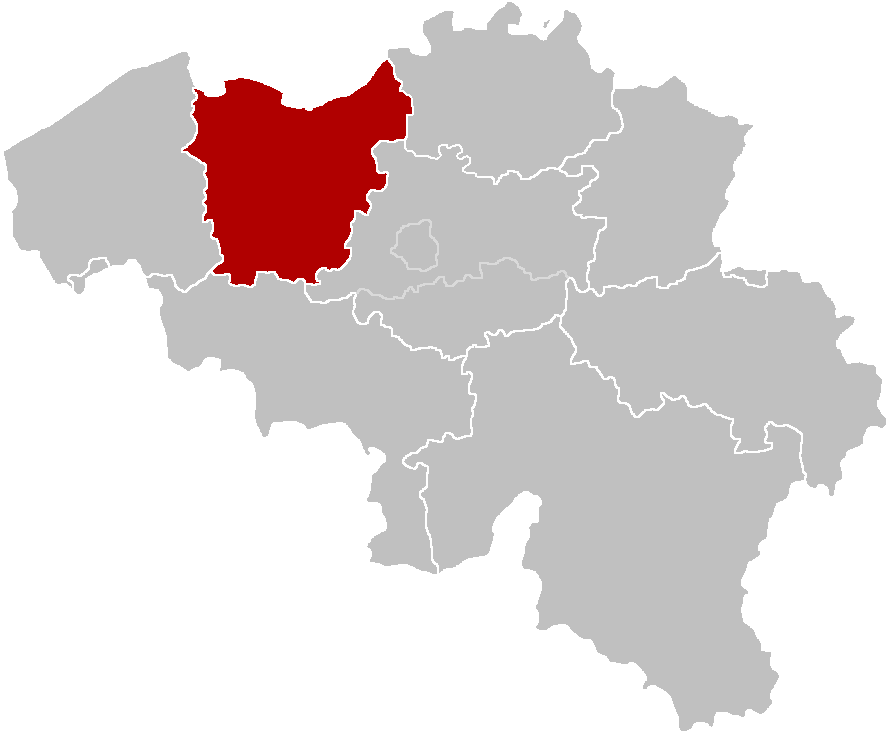
- The Diocese of Ghent, is almost coextensive with the province of East Flanders. It also includes the municipality of Zwijndrecht

The Diocese of Ghent (Latin: Dioecesis Gandavensis) is a Latin Church ecclesiastical territory or diocese of the Catholic Church in Belgium. It is a suffragan in the ecclesiastical province of the metropolitan Archdiocese of Mechelen-Brussels. The patron of the diocese is Saint Bavo of Ghent.

== History ==
The diocese was erected in 1559 by papal bull Super universas to become independent of the Diocese of Tournai. Ghent had an important local administration and was the location of the Abbey of Saint Bavo, founded by Saint Amandus. However, this abbey was suppressed and the canons were removed, moving to the collegiate church of Saint John, and it changed its name to Saint Bavo. This collegiate church became the see of the current diocese. The diocese was created from the surrounding dioceses in Belgium.

== Territorial structure ==
Originally, the diocese was much larger and contained the city of Hulst. Currently, the diocese is coextensive with the Belgian province of East Flanders, in addition to the municipality of Zwijndrecht, which is in the secular Province of Antwerp.

== Administration ==
The diocese produced some important priests and clergy like Edward Poppe. The current bishop is Abbot Lode Van Hecke who was appointed by pope Francis in 2019. The diocese is a suffragan of the Archdiocese of Mechelen-Brussels.

== Saints ==
- Pharaildis
- Bavo of Ghent
- Livinus

== Ordinaries ==
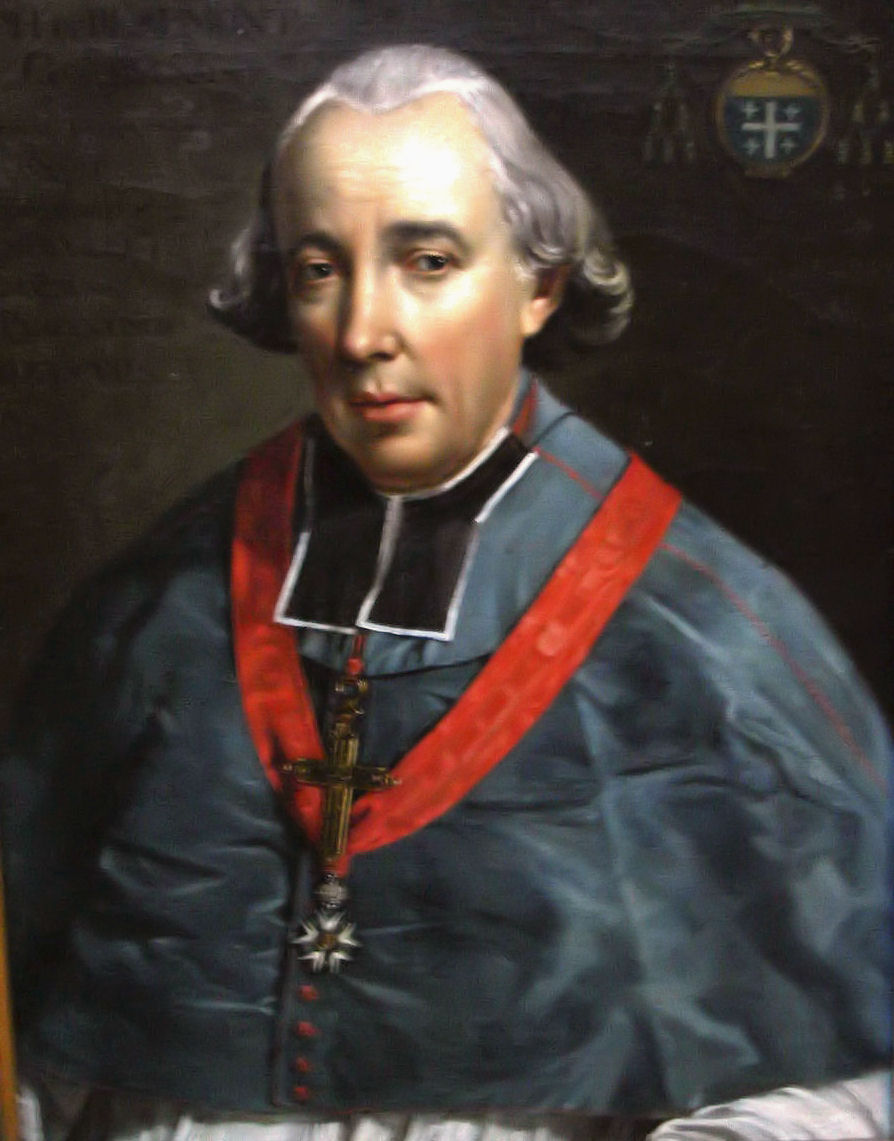
Stefaan-Andreas de Paula Fallot de Beaumont

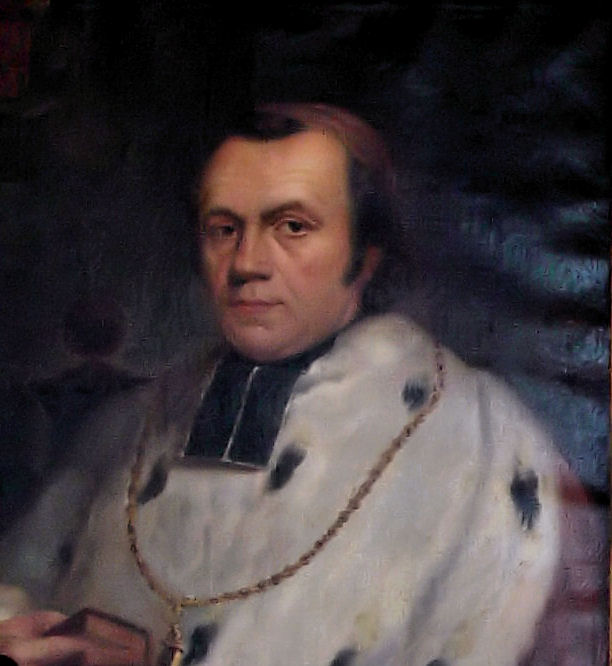
Henricus Franciscus Bracq

The Bishop of Ghent is the ordinary of the Diocese of Ghent.

List of the bishops of the Diocese of Ghent, Belgium

	Tenure	Incumbent	Device	Reason for exit
1	1568–1576	Cornelius Jansenius (1510–1576)	State	Died
2	1588	Wilhelmus Damasus van der Linden (1525–1588)	Quæ sursum quærite	Died
3	1590–1609	Pieter Damant (1530–1609)	Deum redama	Died
4	1610–1612	Charles Maes (1559–1612)	Deo duce	Died
5	1613–1616	Franciscus van der Burch (1567–1644)	Unitas libertatis ars	Appointed Archbishop of Cambrai
6	1617–1620	Jacobus Boonen (1573–1655)	Vince in bono	Appointed Archbishop of Mechelen
7	1622–1657	Antoon Triest (1577–1657)	Confidenter	Died
8	1660–1665	Carolus van den Bosch (1597–1665)	Crucierne crucier	Died
9	1666–1673	Eugeen-Albert, count d'Allamont (1609–1673)	Patiens esto	Died
10	1677–1679	Frans van Horenbeke (1630–1679)	Facere et docere	Died
11	1679–1680	Ignace Schetz de Grobbendonk (1625–1680)	In labore quies	Died
12	1681–1694	Albert de Hornes (1640–1694)	Lex tua meditatione mea est	Died
13	1695–1730	Philips Erard van der Noot (1638–1730)	Respice finem	Died
14	1730–1741	Jean-Baptiste de Smet (1674–1741)	Caelestia cude arma	Died
15	1743–1770	Maximilien Antoine van der Noot (1685–1770)	Respice finem	Died
16	1772–1778	Govaart-Geeraard van Eersel (1713–1778)	Ordinate et provide	Died
17	1779–1795	Ferdinand-Marie, prince von Lobkowitz (1726–1795)	Ad haerere Deus bonum	Died
18	1802–1807	Stefaan-Andreas de Paula Fallot de Beaumont (1750–1835)		Appointed Bishop of Piacenza, Italy
19	1807–1821	Maurits-Jan-Magdalena, prince de Broglie (1766–1821)		Died
20	1829–1838	Jan Frans Van de Velde (1779–1838)	Auxilium a domino	Died
21	1838–1864	Louis-Joseph Delebecque (1798–1864)	Monstra te esse Matrem	Died
22	1865–1888	Henricus Franciscus Bracq (1804–1888)	In nomine Domini	Died
23	1888–1889	Henri-Charles Lambrecht (1848–1889)		Died
24	1890–1916	Antoon Stillemans (1832–1916)	Vivat Jezus	Died
25	1917–1927	Emilius Seghers (1855–1927)		Died
26	1927–1947	Honoré Jozef Coppieters (1874–1947)	Fide et Caritate	Died
27	1947–1963	Karel Justinus Calewaert (1893–1963)	Caritate veritatis	Died
28	1963–1991	Léonce-Albert Van Peteghem (1916–2004)	In Deo salutari	Retired
29	1991–2003	Arthur Luysterman (born 1932)	In terra pax	Retired
30	2004–2019	Lucas Van Looy (born 1941)	In nomine patris	Retired
31	2019–2025	Lode Van Hecke (born 1950)	Cum gaudio spiritus sancti	Retired

== Other affiliated bishops ==
=== Coadjutor Bishops ===
- Gustavo Leonardo de Battice (1877–1885), did not succeed to see
- Franciscus Renatus Boussen (1832–1834), did not succeed to see; appointed Bishop of Brugge {Bruges}
- Honoré-Joseph Coppieters (1927)
- Henri-Charles-Camille Lambrecht (1886–1888)
- Arthur Luysterman (1990–1991)

=== Auxiliary Bishops ===
- Leo-Karel De Kesel (1960–1990)
- Nicolas French (1668–1678)
- Oscar Jozef Joliet (1948–1969)
- Eugène van Rechem (1914–1943)

=== Other priests of this diocese who became bishops ===
- Lodewijk Aerts, appointed Bishop of Brugge {Bruges} in 2016
- Josef De Kesel, appointed auxiliary bishop of Mechelen-Brussel {Malines-Brussels} in 2002; later cardinal
- Gustaaf Joos, appointed a titular archbishop and then cardinal in 2003
- Paul Van den Berghe, appointed bishop of Antwerp in 1980
- François Camille Van Ronslé (priest here 1886–1889), appointed Vicar Apostolic of Belgian Congo in 1896

== See also ==
- Major Seminary of Ghent
- St. Joseph Minor Seminary: former Seminary of the diocese.
- Paul van Imschoot
- List of Catholic churches in Belgium
