= Cyriel =

Cyriel is a given name. Notable people with the name include:

- Cyriel Barbary (1899–2004), the last known Belgian veteran of the First World War
- Cyriel Buysse (1859–1932), Flemish naturalist author and playwright
- Cyriel Coupe (1918–1998) (pseudonym Anton van Wilderode), Belgian priest, teacher, writer and poet
- Cyriel Dessers (born 1994), professional footballer
- Cyriel Geerinck (1889–1955), Flemish educator, poet, writer and stage director
- Cyriel Omey (1897–1977), Belgian racing cyclist
- Cyriel Pennartz (born 1963), Dutch neuroscientist, professor at the University of Amsterdam
- Cyriel Vanoverberghe (1912–1995), Belgian racing cyclist
- Cyriel Verschaeve (1874–1949), Flemish nationalist priest and writer
