= Louis Courtois =

Louis Courtois may refer to:

- Louis Courtois (bobsleigh)
- Louis Courtois (illusionist)
