= RC Hamme =

Belgian rugby union club, based in Hamme

Rugby Club Hamme
- Founded: 2011; 15 years ago
- Location: Hamme, Belgium
- Chairman: Didier Christiaens
- Coach(es): Jo Vertongen, Rik Casier
- League: Flemish Regional 1
Team kit

RC Hamme is a Belgian rugby union club in Hamme.
