= Amaat Joos =

Flemish priest, prelate, educationalist, dialectologist and folklorist

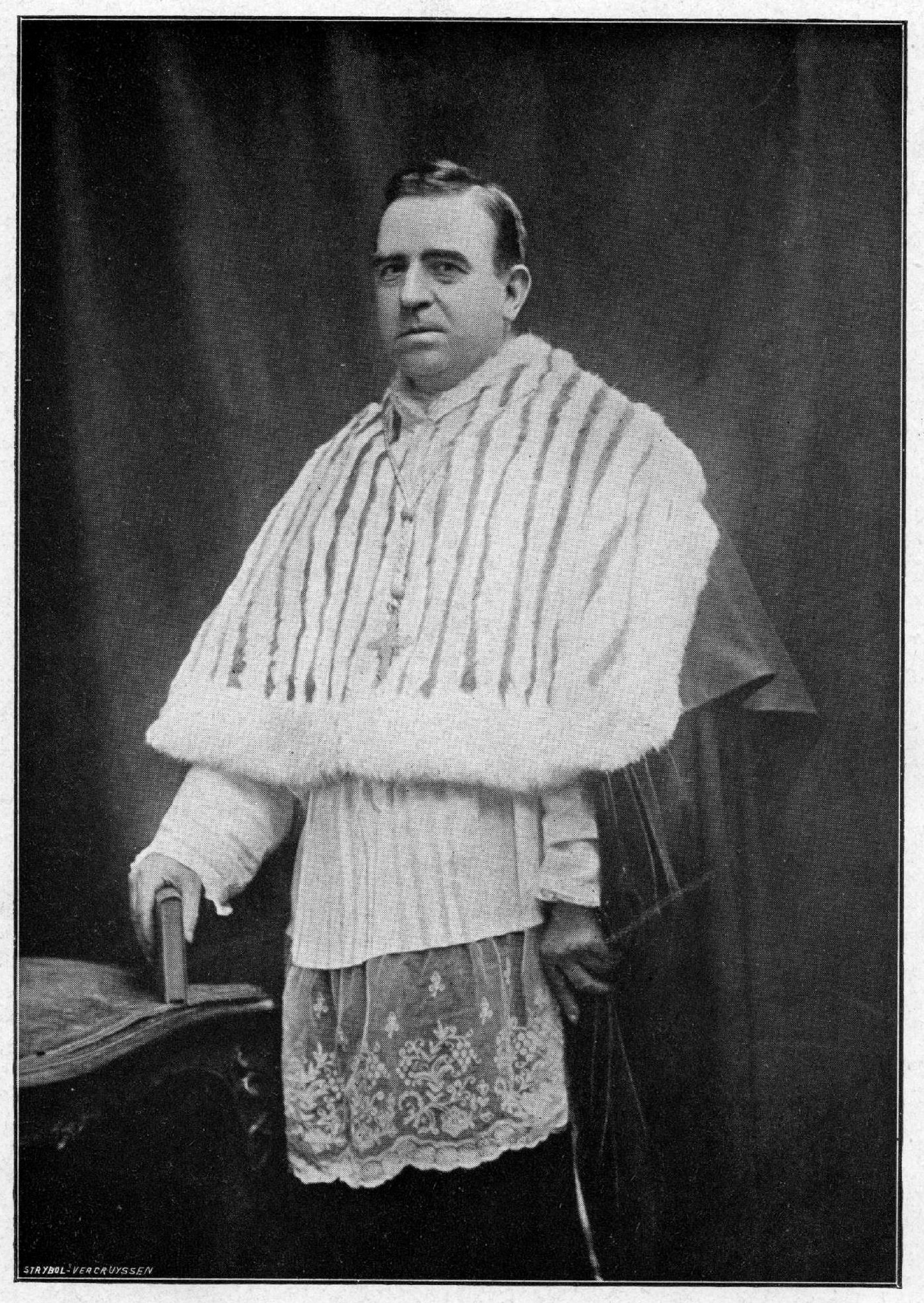
Amaat Joos celebrating 35 years as professor and director of the Episcopal Normal School

Amaat Honoraat Joos (3 May 1855 in Hamme – 15 August 1937 in Ghent) was a Flemish priest and prelate who became well known as an educationalist, dialectologist and folklorist.

== Life ==
Joos studied at St. Joseph Minor Seminary in Sint-Niklaas. There he was influenced by the superior Antoon Stillemans. After ordination to the priesthood in 1881 he became head of the diocesan normal school in Sint-Niklaas. He wrote important works on Flemish linguistics and promoted the use and formal teaching of Dutch in Catholic schools, himself compiling grammar textbooks for the purpose. He resigned from the normal school in 1915, becoming chaplain to an order of nursing sisters.

Joos was a prolific contributor to the periodicals Het Belfort and Rond den Heerd, and in 1899 he founded a short-lived monthly periodical of Flemish folklore, Vlaamsche Zanten, stopping publication in 1901 for lack of funds. In 1900 he became a corresponding member of the Royal Academy of Dutch language and literature, and in 1905 a full member, serving as director from 1914 to 1920. He was a frequent contributor to the academy's proceedings, Verslagen & Mededelingen. In 1908 he became a corresponding member of the Maatschappij der Nederlandse Letterkunde, based in Leiden.

== Works ==
- De zingende Knaap, 65 schoolliederen (Ghent, 1879) – a collection of songs for use in schools
- Vlaamsche Spraakkunst ten gebruike van het middelbaar en normaal onderwijs (Ghent, 1884) – a Flemish grammar for use in secondary and normal schools
- Kleine spraakkunst met oefeningen, volgens het schoolprogramma van 1884 (3 vols., Ghent 1885) – a school grammar and exercise book
- Schatten uit de Volkstaal (Ghent, 1885)
- Waasch idioticon: bewerkt met de medehulp van veel taalminnende Wazenaars (Ghent, A. Siffer, 1900) – a dictionary of the dialect of Waasland
- Raadsels van het Vlaamsche volk, gerangschikt, vergeleken en verklaard (Ghent, 1888) – a collection of Flemish riddles
- Vertelsels van het Vlaamsche volk (4 vols., Ghent and Tielt, 1889-1892) – a collection of Flemish folktales
- Levenswijsheid en Menschenkennis (1927) – a collection of aphorisms

== Honours ==
- 1905: Honorary Canon of Saint Bavo's.
- Knight in the Order of Leopold.
- 1934: Commander in the Order of the Crown
