= Camil Van Hulse =

Belgian musician (1897–1988)

Camil Anton Johan Van Hulse (1 August 1897 in Sint-Niklaas, East Flanders, Belgium – 16 July 1988 in Tucson, Arizona, United States) was a Belgian-American pianist, organist, teacher, and composer.

== Biography ==
Camil Van Hulse's father, Gustaaf Van Hulse, was composer and organist of the deanery church of St. Nicholas. His mother, Mary Pelagia Coppens, was a gifted pianist and singer. At age six, Camil got his first musical education in piano and music theory, and later in harmony and counterpoint, from his father, a disciple of Edgar Tinel. By the age of twelve, he was able to play the organ, lead a choir, and sing Gregorian chant from attending church services with his father. From then on, he regularly substituted for his father as organist and conductor.

Van Hulse attended school in Sint-Niklaas at the St. Joseph Institute and then studied Greek and Latin at the St. Joseph Minor Seminary, a Roman Catholic college which provided basic training for the priesthood. He followed this course until the first quarter of his third year, after which he devoted himself entirely to music. In addition to his passion for music, he also loved to read. He kept in touch with his former teachers and old college friends.

At the outbreak of World War I in 1914, Van Hulse joined the military at the age of seventeen. During the war, he suffered exposure to poison gas and was told that he had six months to live. He also suffered from tuberculosis.

In 1919, he began study at the Royal Conservatoire of Antwerp despite his poor health. He studied with Edward Verheyden (harmony and composition), Frans Lenaert (piano), Constant Lenaert (chamber music), and Lodewijk Mortelmans (counterpoint). That same year, he succeeded his father as organist at St. Nicholas Church in Sint-Niklaas. In 1922, he was awarded the prize for harmony with highest distinction and the Royal Medal, as well as the Albert De Vleeschouwer prize. In 1923 he was awarded the highest distinction for piano and the Royal Medal.

After graduating, Van Hulse's first concern was his health. His doctor told him that he would benefit from a warm and dry climate. Therefore, he moved to Oklahoma in September 1923 and then to Tucson, Arizona, at that time one of the most musical cities in America. Tucson is also known for its favorable climate for pulmonary patients. After spending a summer in Tucson, where the temperature is close to 100 degrees Fahrenheit, he felt much better and decided to stay there. During that time he also changed the spelling of his name from Kamiel to Camil.

In 1924, he married Augusta Nijs, a woman to whom he had already been engaged in Belgium. They had two children, Lesghinka and Aziadé.

For Van Hulse, the musical life of Tucson was of great importance. He gave private lessons in piano, organ, harmony, and counterpoint. In 1924 he was given a permanent position as organist at All Saints Church, and later he became organist and choirmaster of Ss. Peter and Paul Church. He was the founding conductor of the Tucson Symphony Orchestra. He combined this work with a busy career as a concert pianist. As a composer, he published 130 works. He composed music in all major genres except opera. Van Hulse maintained the late romantic style, but combined this with modern trends such as Expressionism. In 1956, he retired in order to devote himself entirely to composition. His compositions received numerous awards. In addition to his professional career as a musician, he was also a skilled linguist and is included in the Dictionary of Linguists. He also has a place in the Dictionary of Musicians.

In 1930, Camil Van Hulse returned to Belgium for the first time. For a while, he traveled back to his native country every two years to visit his family and friends. In 1946 he won four prizes - two awarded by the Society of Arizona Composers for an instrumental composition Suite for Cello and Piano and for a vocal number, and 'The Beatitudes', a choral work with piano and organ accompaniment (first presented in Tucson on 8 May that year). A fourth prize was the national J. Fischer & Bro. prize from the American Guild of Organists, won with his 'Toccata' for Grand Organ.

In 1957, the Bibliotheca Wasiana organized a tribute concert in honor of his sixtieth birthday. For the 750th anniversary of the city of Sint-Niklaas, he wrote The Ballad of the Six Knights for orchestra, choir and baritone solo on a text by Anton van Wilderode.

Camil Van Hulse died at the age of 90 in Tucson, Arizona.

== Works ==
=== With opus numbers ===
- Opus 39-Toccata for grand organ (1946)
- Opus 52-Festival "Veni creator spiritus" Postlude on For the organ. (1948) (sometimes also, probably erroneously, referred to as "Festival Prelude etc.')
- Opus 53-Symphonia mystica (1953) (here a recording of the Scherzo by Gabriel Dessauer)
- Opus 56/1-Ricercata quasi fantasia sopra B. A. C. H. (1949)
- Opus 58-Fantasia contrappuntistica sopra "O filii et filiae". (1949)
- Opus 62-Gaudeamus (Toccata-fantasy) (1953)
- Opus 63, No. 1-Little Suite for carillon (1970)
- Opus 63, No. 2-Lamentoso for organ (1951)
- Opus 65-Jubilee Suite (1951)
- Opus 66-St. Louis, King of France: symphonic poem in seven tableaux, for organ (1954)
- Opus 68-Devotional Moments for Organ, Book 1 (1951)
- Opus 73 1-3-Three Short Pieces for Organ (1951)
- Opus 73/4-6-Three interludes (1951)
- Opus 73/7-9-Three chorale preludes (1951)
- Opus 73/10-Chorale-fantasy on St. Magnus (1952)
- Opus 76/1? -Five Christmas fantasies (1951)
- Opus 76/1-Father Brebeuf's carol (1951)
- Opus 76/2-Papago Christmas (1951)
- Opus 76/3-Papago Christmas (Based on a flute call and two authentic Indian melodies collected at the Papago Reservation, south and southeast of Tucson, Arizona) (1951)
- Opus 76/3 (!)-Yuletide fantasy on old English carols echoes. (?)
- Opus 76/4 The child Jesus in Flanders: On the chant ' Puer natus est nobis ' and two old Flemish carols. (1951)
- Opus 76/5-Joyeux noel! fantasy on old French carols (1951)
- Opus 77-Messe basse, no.1, organ music for Low Mass on Eucharistic themes: Praeludium, Offertory, Elevation, After the elevation, Domine, non sum dignus, Communion, Postlude (1952)
- Opus 78 -Meditations on well known hymn tunes for Organ (1953)
- Opus 80/1-7-Seven Preludes on Advent Hymns (1952 or 1954) (O Lord, how shall I meet tea, On Jordan's bank the Baptist's cry, The advent of our King, O come, Oh come, Emmanuel, Come, Thou precious Ransom, come, When sinners see their lost condition, Hail to the Lord's Anointed)
- Opus 80/8-14-Seven Preludes on Christmas Hymns (1952) (Oh, rejoice, ye Christians, loudly, Hail the day so rich in cheer, Savior of the nations, come, All my heart this night rejoices, O Jesus Christ, Thy manger is, Christians, sing out with exultation, Christ the Lord to us is born)
- Opus 80/15-21-Seven Preludes on Hymns for Lent (1954) (Upon the cross extended, Lord Jesus, Thou art going forth, O darkest woe, The death of Jesus Christ, our Lord, Glory be to Jesus, O dearest Jesus, what law hast thou broken, There is a fountain, filled with blood)
- Opus 80/22-28-Seven preludes on hymns for Holy Week (1954) (it Was on that dark, that doleful night; The seven words on the cross; Our blessed Savior spoke seven times; Lord Jesus, we give thanks to Thee; Behold the Savior of mankind; Jesus, I will ponder now; Throned upon the awe-full tree)
- Opus 80-Seven preludes on hymns for Easter (1955) (Praeludium dramaticum: Ye sons and daughters of the King = Blueish sei Gott; Morning canticle: Welcome, happy morning! = Sei du mir gegruesset: "Enchiridion"; Morning breaks upon the tomb: Innocents; Triptych: Christ is Christ ist erstanden arisen; Vesper musings: Abide with us, the day is waning = Wer nur den lieben Gott; Easter chimes: Come, ye faithful, raise the strain = Schwing dich auf; Flourish: Awake, my heart, with gladness = Auf, auf, mein Herz)
- Opus 80/29-35? -Seven preludes on hymns for general use (1961) (Open now thy gates of beauty; God of mercy, God of Grace; O day of rest and gladness; Blessed are the sons of God; All ye who on this earth do dwell; It is not death to die; Praise God, from Whom all blessings flow)
- Opus 81-Seven Preludes on Plainsong Hymns (1955 or 1952)
- Opus 82-The church modes (Part 1. Modes I-V, Part 2. Modes VI-VIII) (1959)
- Opus 83-Symphonia Elegiaca here a recording of "Last judgement" part 2 by Laure de Leon
- Opus 85-Ten Preludes on Hymn Tunes in Free Style for Organ
- Opus 86-Eleven Improvisations for Organ (1957) (St. Catherine, St. Agnes, St. Bernard, The Filius, Sawley, Magdalena, Newington, Everton, Waring, St. John, St. Anne)
- Opus 88-Ten preludes for organ based on well known hymn tunes (1954)
- Opus 89-Messe basse, no.2, organ music for Low Mass in honor of the Blessed Virgin Mary: Prelude and Postlude Introit, Offertory, Communion, Elevation, (1954)
- Opus 92-Devotional Moments for Organ, Book 2 (1954)
- Opus 93-Messe basse, no. 4: organ music for low mass and Introit, Offertory on Paschal themes: Prelude, Elevation, elevation, After Communion, check-fanfare (1958)
- Opus 94-Four short pieces for organ: Preludietto, Sarabande, Dirge, Passacaglia brevis (1957)
- Opus 98-Harqua-hala; 3 nature sketches for Hammond organ (1960)
- Opus 99-Devotional Moments for Organ, Book 3 (1956)
- Opus 100-No. 3 Messe basse for Christmastide: Introit, Offertory, Prelude and Postlude Elevation, Communion, (1957)
- Opus 102-Organ and chimes: compositions (1954) here a recording of ' Evening Song ' and ' Meditation ' by an unknown organist
- Opus 103/2-Christmas rhapsody (1958)
- Opus 103/3-Solemn Prelude for a Festal Day (1962)
- Opus 105-Sonata for Organ (1964)
- Opus 106-Seven Preludes and Fugues (1961)
- Opus 107-Biblical Sketches (1958)
- Opus 110-Suite for Organ (1960)
- Opus 114-12 short preludes ludia breviora per omni toni in all keys for organ (1963)
- Opus 118-Devotional Moments for Organ, Book 4 (1951)
- Opus 121-The Little Organ Book Thirty Seven Easy Pieces For Hammond And Pipe Organs (1961) (various composers including by Hulse)
- Opus 122-Ten service pieces based on hymn tunes for organ (1962)
- Opus 124-Soli Deo Gloria (10 Pieces for Organ)
- Opus 126-Short Pieces on Gregorian Themes. For Organ (1963)
- Opus 127-Organ Music for Church, 11 Pieces for Organ (1963)
- Opus 125/1-Marche pontificale (1962)
- Opus 130-Ten Pieces for Organ. For church use (1966)
- Opus 132-Suite for Easter: four pieces for organ: Prelude on "Singers, Sing", Meditation on "Jesus Christ Is Risen Today", Improvisation on "Ye Sons and Daughters", Toccatina on "Christ, the Lord, Is Risen Today (1966)
- Opus 140-Hommage pour grand orgue Breughel: Pome rhapsodique (1974)
- Opus 144-Sinfonia da chiesa (1973)
- Opus 150-Prelude et Fugue sur B.A.C.H. (1974)

=== Opus number is unknown or not yet found ===
- Bachianas Brasileiras No. 5. by Heitor Villa-Lobos (1887-1959)-Aria Cantilena; arranged for organ solo by Camil van Hulse (1960)
- Easter Morn. -Fantasy on Easter themes For organ and piano (1951)
- Three interludes on a plain chant for organ (1951)
- Four Short Pieces for Organ (Original Compositions for the Organ. New Series) (1957)
- Miniatures: 1. Madonna, 2. Shadows, 3. Snowflakes, for organ ... transcribed by Camil van Hulse (1958)
- Seven pieces for the service (petite suite) (1959)
- Little cycle through the Christian Year for Hammond and Pipe Organs (1960)
- Three Chorale Preludes (1962)
- Postlude for solo organ (1962)
- At the manger in Bethlehem (1962)
- Organ music for church: eleven pieces for organ (1963)
- Nuptial cortege, for organ. With Hammond organ registration (1965)
- Suite For Easter-Four Pieces For Organ (1966)
- Aria For Organ With Hammond And Pipe Organ Registration (1967)
- Epithalamium (Wedding Music) for Church Organ; on a chorale by Melchior Vulpius (1978)
- Fantaisie-Toccata on Dies irae
- Two piano four hands version of Muzio Clementi's Sonatina in C Major, opus 36 no 1
- The Kino Saga Symphony (in honor of Jesuit missionary Eusebio Francisco Kino; in two movements) ca. 1982

=== Collect bundles with other composers ===
- The parish organist. Part two. One hundred twenty chorale preludes, postludes, voluntaries and by older masters and contemporary composers. A.o. My hope is built on nothing less = Magdalen/Camil van Hulse (1953)
- The parish organist. Part three. One hundred twenty chorale preludes, postludes, voluntaries and by older masters and contemporary composers. A.o. Take my life and let it be = Patmos/Camil van Hulse (1953)
- Intervolatures for Organ: Marche pontificale; Gaudeamus/dice, Postlude/McGrath, Exsultate Deo/Ventura (1957)
- Miniatures for Organ: Andante religioso/j. McGrath, Pontifical/c. Van Hulse, Modern/l. die (1961)
