= Cyriel Geerinck =

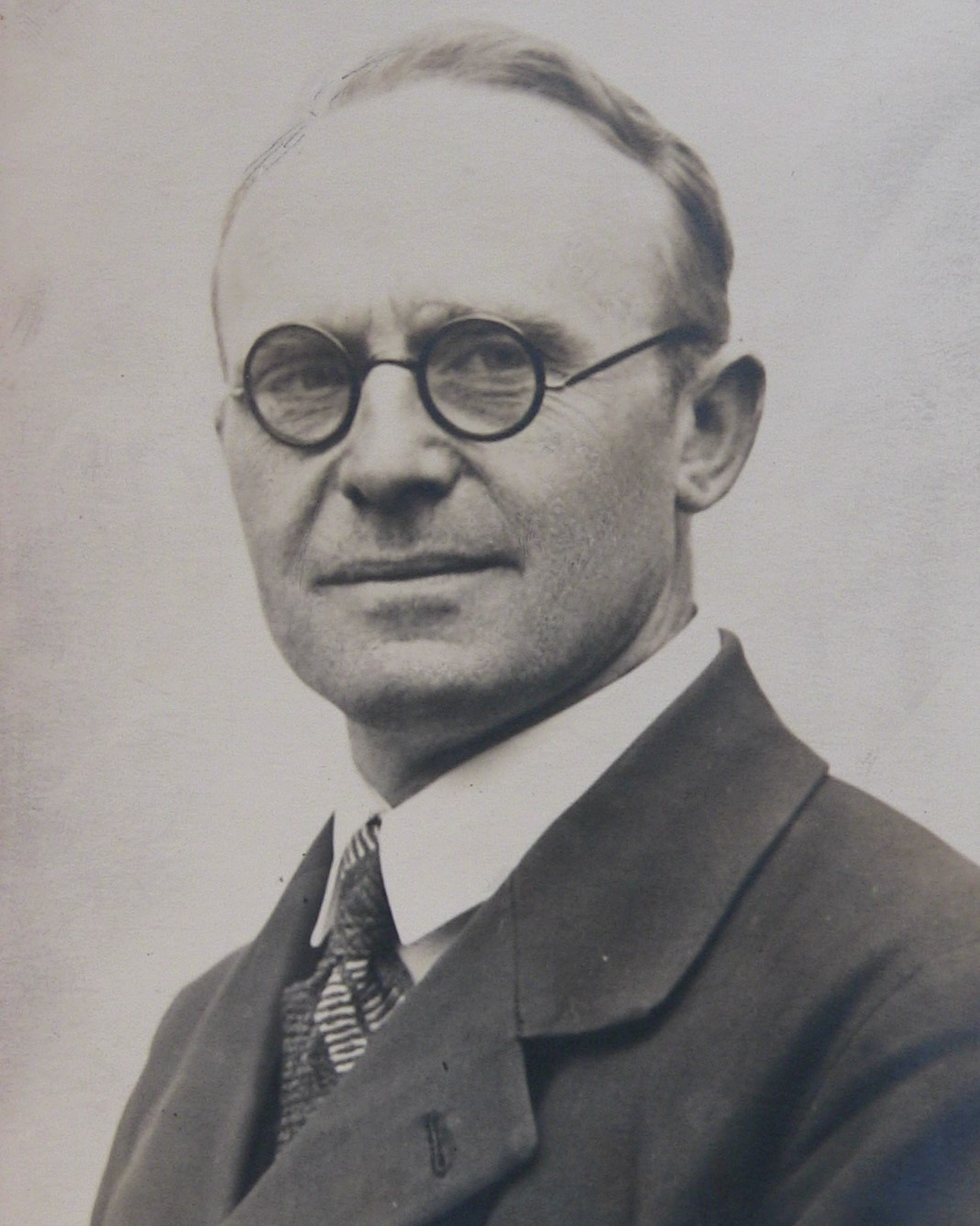
- Photo published in the book L'Etang bleu in 1938
- Born: Cyriel Geerinck; 5 August 1889; Waasmunster, Belgium
- Died: 19 October 1955 (aged 67); Sint-Niklaas, Belgium
- Resting place: Waasmunster cemetery, East Flanders, Belgium
- Occupations: Writer, poet
- Writing career
- Pen name: RL Doornkapper, Jan van Hasselt, J. Herten
- Language: Dutch, French
- Notable work: L'Etang Bleu

Cyriel (also spelled Cyrille) Geerinck (5 August 1889 – 19 October 1955) was a Flemish educator, poet, writer and stage director. He was active as a teacher in the Waasland. He studied pedagogy at the St. Joseph Minor Seminary in Sint-Niklaas. In 1909 he started working in the municipal primary school of Waasmunster, where he taught until the 1945-1946 school year.

== Biography ==
=== Early life ===
He was active as a teacher in the Waasland. He was educated in pedagogy at the St. Joseph Minor Seminary in Sint-Niklaas. In 1909 he started working in the municipal primary school of Waasmunster. Here taught until the 1945-1946 school year.

Geerinck also taught in French to both school children and adults. He was also active for many years as an inspiration and director of the theater companies Onder ons and Rust Roest. He sat for more than 30 years as an active board member in the party committee of Waasmunster and he was the guiding force behind the so-called Roosenbergfeesten of the Roosenberg Abbey. He was also active in municipal politics for the CVP. Although not officially elected to office, he was present at many city councils.

=== Activity as a poet ===
As a poet, he wrote several collections of poetry, both in Dutch and in French. His most famous poem is L'Etang Bleu, published in 1938 by Ed. Vermaut. It was warmly received in Belgium but also in France, and frequently reprinted. Because of his literary affinity with the French language, Geerinck's work as a man of letters is influenced by the French literature of the 19th century. Geerinck's style of poetry is characterized by many elements and aspects from both Symbolism and Realism. He was a great admirer of the Flemish French-speaking poet Emile Verhaeren. The works of Verhaeren would be a lasting stimulus throughout Cyriel's literary career.

In addition, strong influences from spiritualism can be observed in his work. He was a convinced Catholic and Fleming.

=== Death ===
He was hit by a vehicle near Sinaai while riding his bicycle, and taken to the hospital of Sint-Niklaas with a fractured skull. He died there in a comatose state on 19 October 1955. The funeral took place on 22 October. Former students and prominent figures formed a guard of honor to pay a final greeting to Geerinck. He was buried in the Waasmunster cemetery.
