= Van Uytvanck =

Van Uytvanck is a surname. Notable people with the surname include:

- Alison Van Uytvanck (born 1994), Belgian tennis player
- Benoît Van Uytvanck (1857–1927), Belgian sculptor
