= Frans Van Damme =

Belgian painter (1858–1925)

- Born: Frans Van Damme ca. 1858; Hamme, Belgium
- Died: ca. 1925; Brussels, Belgium
- Education: Royal Academy of Fine Arts of Antwerp; Royal Academy of Brussels.
- Occupation: Painter

Frans Van Damme (1858 – 1925) (Note: According to RKD: 19 September 1860 – 1926; Paul Piron: 1859 – 1925) was a Belgian painter.

== Biography ==
Frans Van Damme was born in Hamme on 19 July 1858. He is best known for his work as a marine painter. Until the age of 12 he attended primary school in Sint-Niklaas. He lived in Waasmunster in his youth. At the age of 27, in 1885, he became professor at the Royal Academy of Fine Arts of Antwerp, and in 1887 at the Royal Academy of Brussels. He won the Prix de Rome and was awarded gold medals in Tunis, Paris and Saint Petersburg, whose Hermitage Museum owns two of his works.

Van Damme was a virtuoso and his work in keeping with the 19th-century tradition of Impressionist realism. He may be compared to Louis Artan. Within this emerging tradition he was nonetheless able to develop his own style. He had several residences and his work is very scattered. His life had a tragic end: his studio in Zeebrugge was destroyed by a bombardment in 1914. He was held captive for a year and came out of the war ruined. He died in Brussels on 30 April 1925.

== Gallery ==
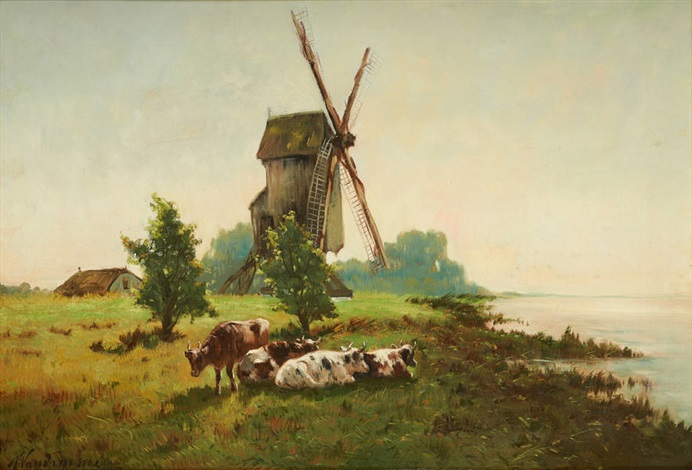
Vaches sur fond de paysage avec moulin, oil on canvas

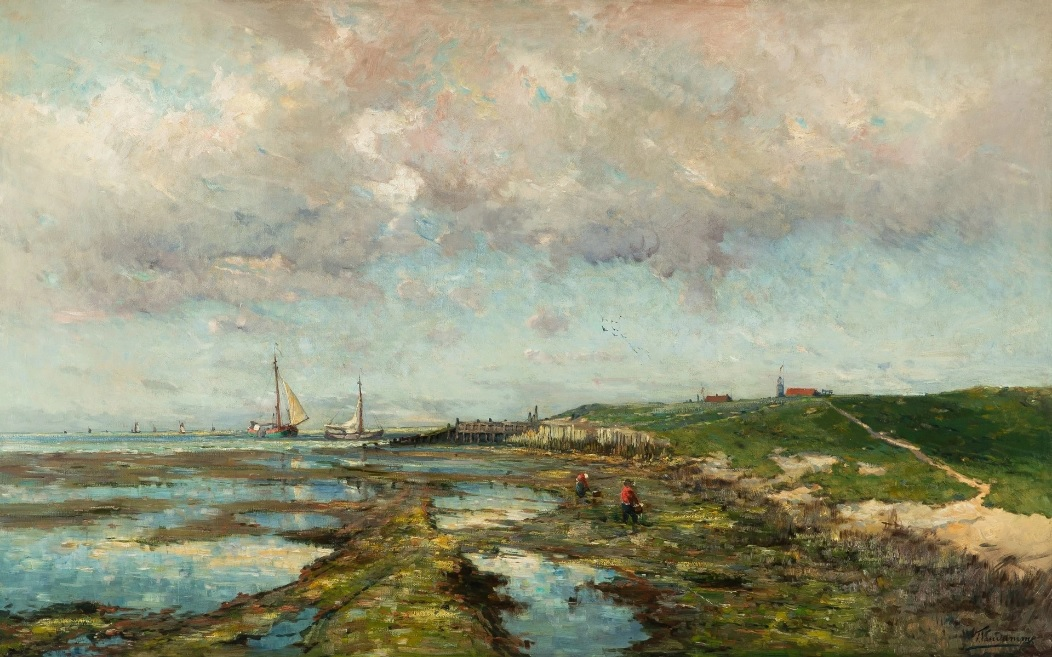
The river Scheldt near Bergen op Zoom, oil on canvas

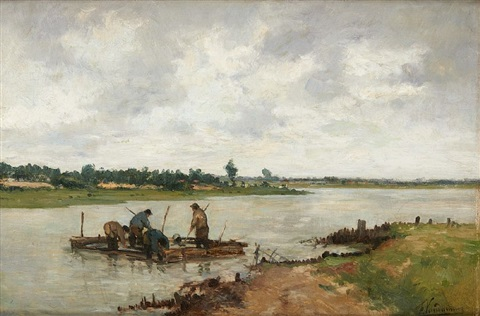
Les passeurs sur le fleuve, oil on panel

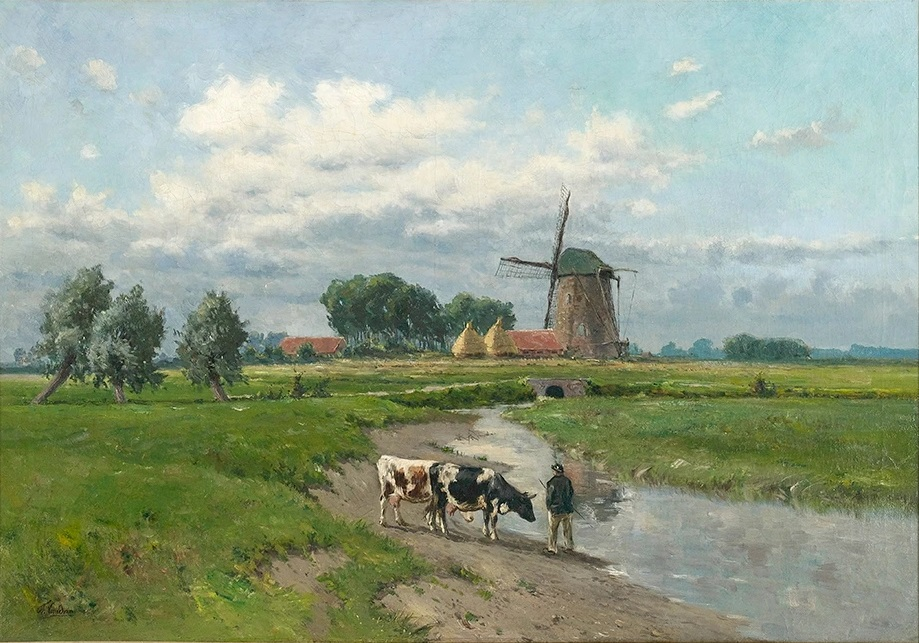
Dutch Landscape with a Windmill and a Farmer with His Cattle, oil on canvas
