= Welden, Belgium =

Welden
- Village
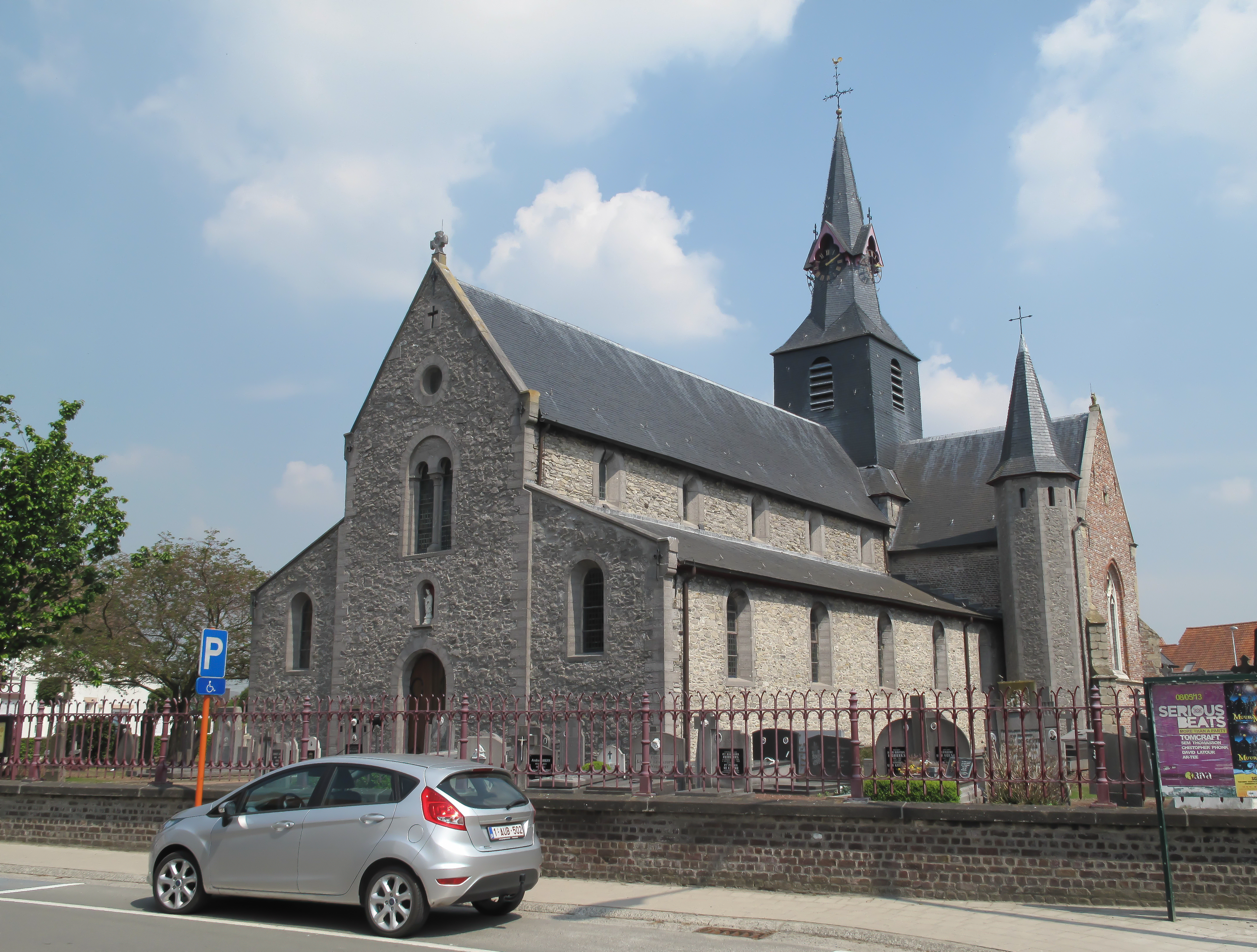
- St Martinus Church

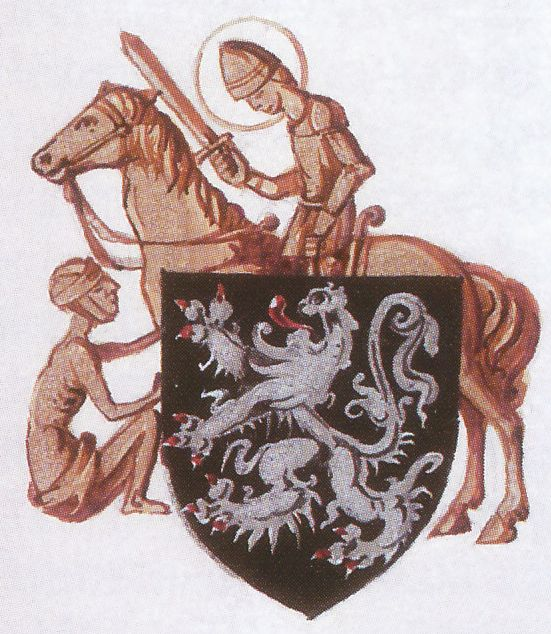
- Seal

- Location in Belgium
- Coordinates: 50.8758°N 3.6546°E
- Country: Belgium
- Region: Flemish Region
- Province: East Flanders
- Municipality: Oudenaarde

Area
  - Total: 6.26 km^{2} (2.42 sq mi)

Population (2021)
  - Total: 1,266
  - Density: 202/km^{2} (524/sq mi)
- Time zone: CET

Welden (Dutch pronunciation: [ˈʋɛldə(n)]) is a village in the municipality of Oudenaarde in the province of East Flanders, Belgium, and is situated along the Scheldt. It is located about 20 kilometres (12 mi) south of Ghent.

== History ==
Welden is situated on the right bank of the Scheldt along the old Roman road from Ghent to Doornik. Artefacts from the Roman era have been discovered. The land near the river was regularly flooded, and poldered in the 11th and 12th century. The village was first mentioned in 1110 as Wenlines, and means "settlement of Wandilo (person)". The area used to be part of East Francia, but was conquered by the Count of Flanders in the mid 11th century. Welden used to contain several heerlijkheden (landed estates). It was mainly a rural village with a few brickworks.

In 1790, Welden was one of the centres of the Flemish peasant's revolt. The farmers protested against the reintroduction of the heerlijkheid system, and demanded the return of the Emperor of Austria. The priest and bailiff tried to calm the masses, but had to flee to Oudenaarde. The revolt was crushed by troops of the United Belgian States. In 1868, a railway station opened on the Denderleeuw to Kortrijk railway line. The railway station closed in 1984.

Welden was an independent municipality until 1971, when it was merged into Oudenaarde.

== Buildings ==
The St Martinus Church originally dates from the 12th century. The church was modified several times during its history. In 1866, it was supposed to be demolished and replaced by a new church. In 1867, it was decided to restore and modify the existing church into a three aisled Gothic Revival church. The church was re-consecrated in 1872. It was damaged during World War I.

== Notable people ==
- Arthur Decabooter, (1936–2012) professional racing cyclist
- Henri-Charles Lambrecht (1848–1889), bishop of Ghent

== Gallery ==
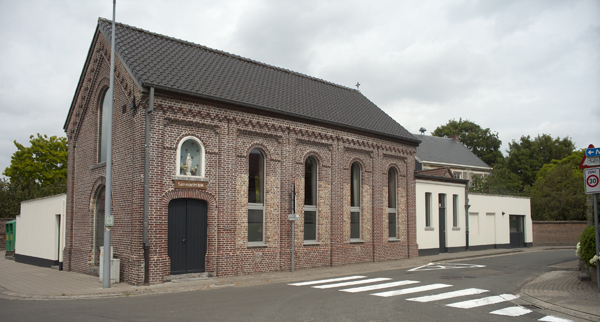
House in Welden

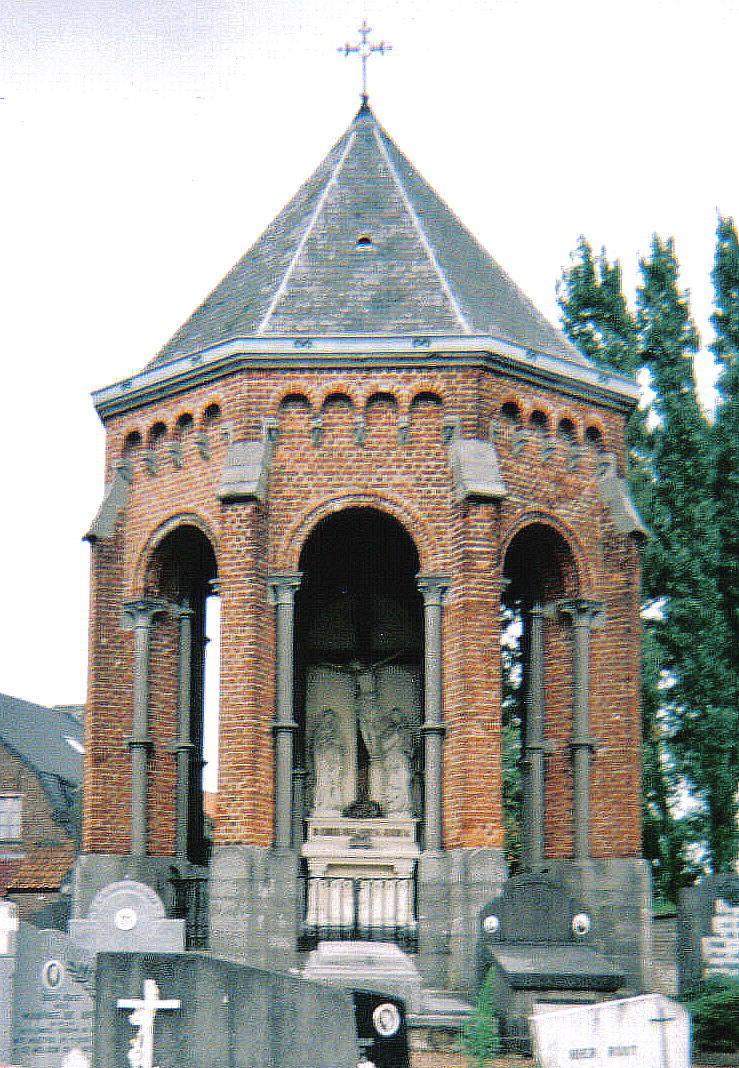
Tomb of Henri-Charles Lambrecht

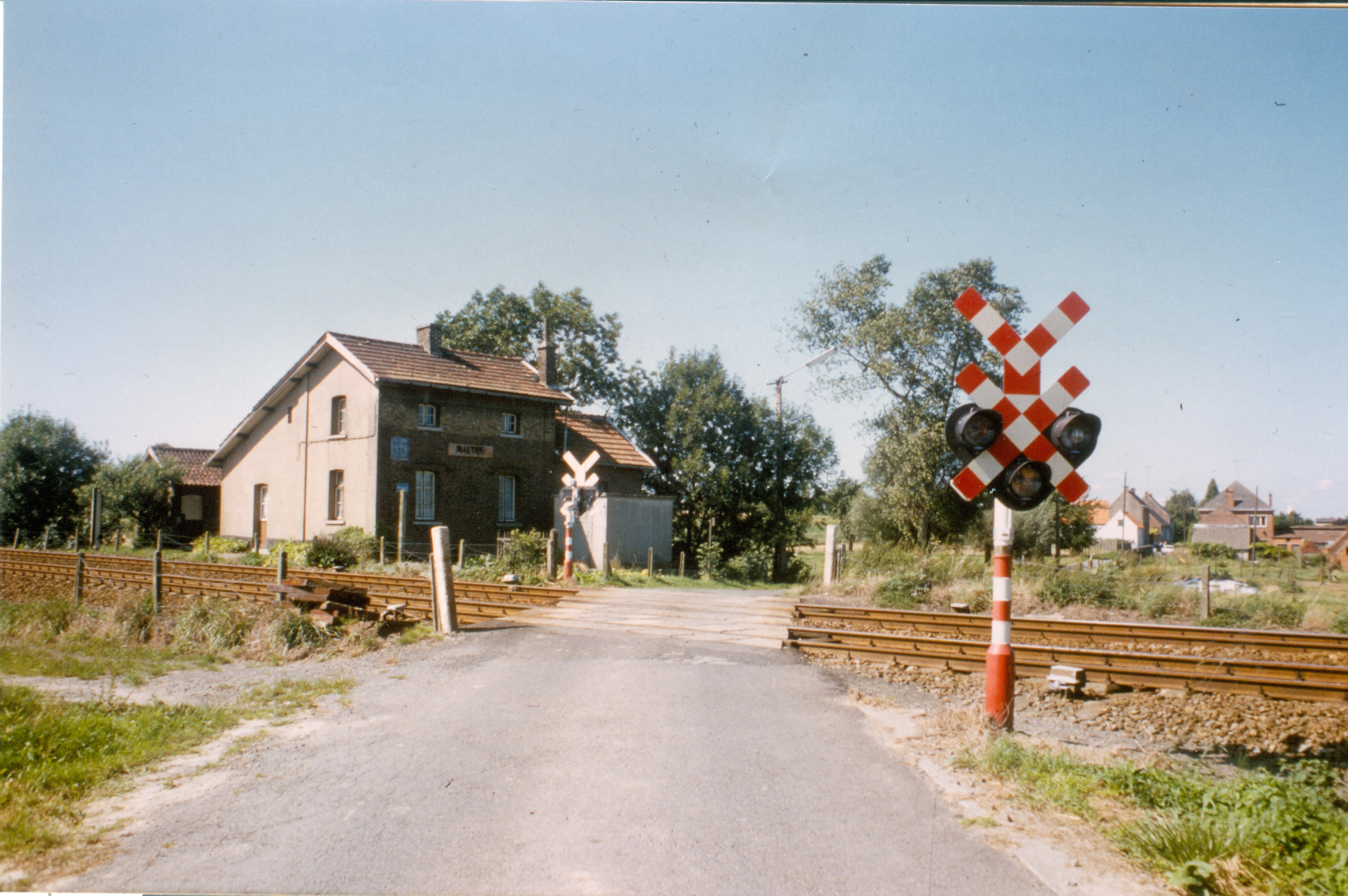
Former railway crossing

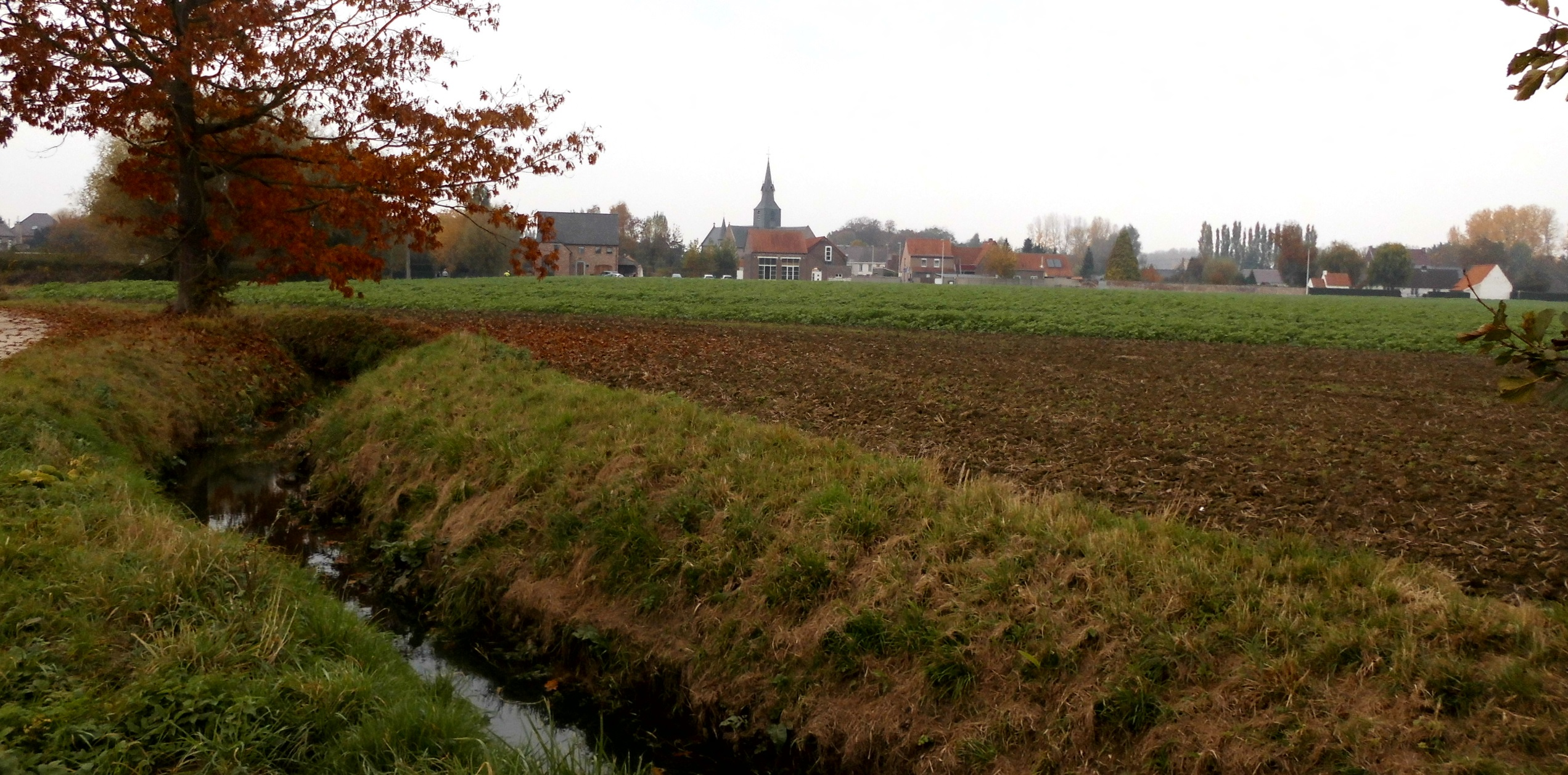
View on Welden
