= Linde Merckpoel =

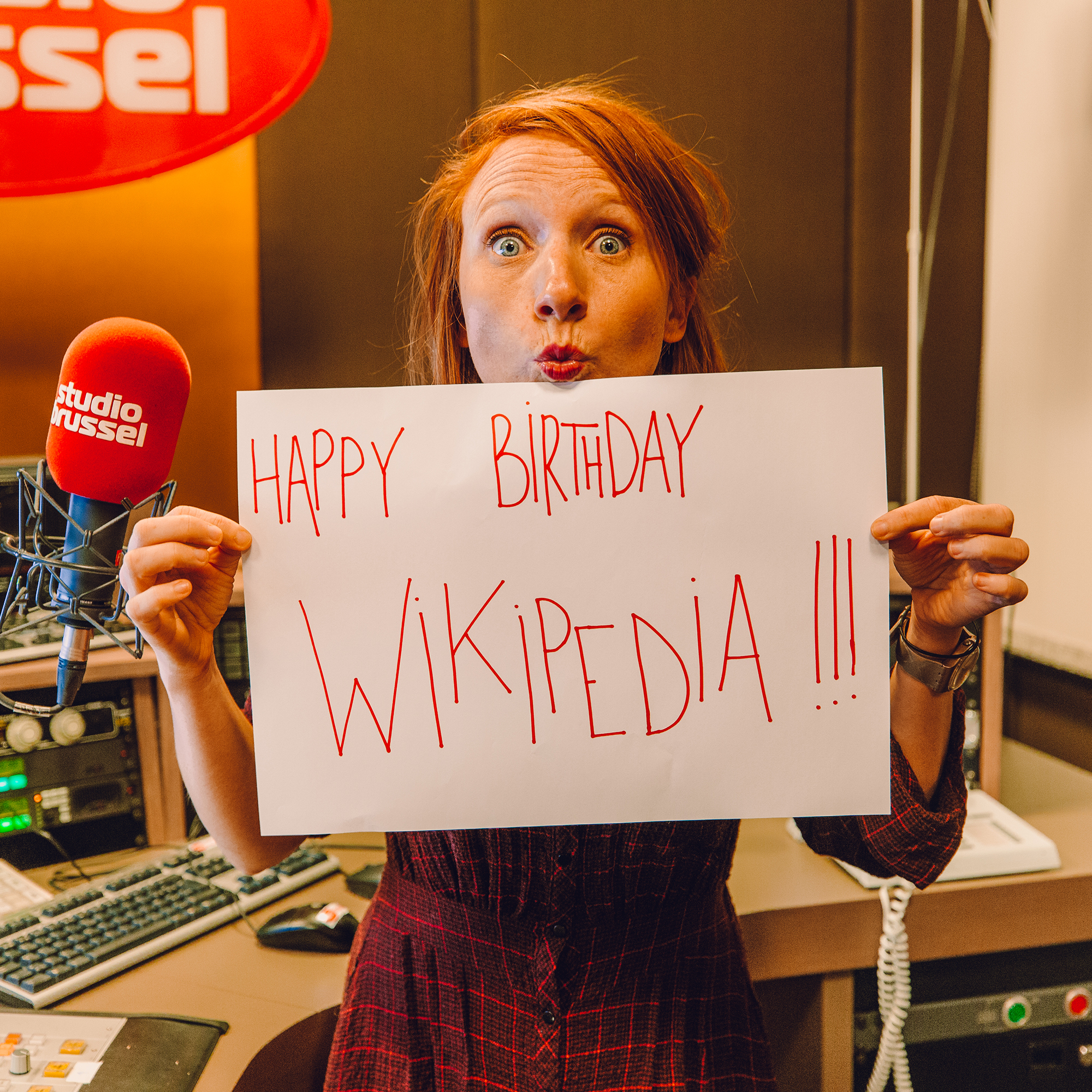
- Born: 17 October 1984 (age 41); Hamme, Belgium
- Presenting career
- Show: De zomer van
- Station: Radio 1
- Network: VRT
- Time slot: 9:00 - 12:00 a.m. Monday-Friday
- Country: Belgium

Linde Merckpoel (born 17 October 1984) is a Belgian vlogger and radio presenter. She was a vlogger for the Flemish public television channel Eén and a radio presenter for the Flemish radio station Studio Brussel where she was a figurehead for years.

== Biography ==
She was born in Hamme and grew up in Eksaare (Lokeren). Her career at VRT radio started in July 2007 at the VRT news service as a newsreader at Studio Brussel and Radio Donna. From September 2008 she became active at Studio Brussel as a radio presenter.

In the fall of 2013 she had her own late evening program on Studio Brussel: Linde Late Night, airing between 10 pm and midnight. In December she was one of the three presenters of Music for Life 2013 (Music For Life 2013). From 6 January 2014 she presented the evening program Linde Live with Joris Lenaerts as her sidekick.

During the 2015-2016 radio season, she presented the At Your Service program on Studio Brussel.

From the 2016-2017 radio season, she presented Linde Staat Op every working day morning from 6 to 9 am. She was assisted in the first two seasons by sidekick Bram Willems, and from September 2018 by Jonas Decleer.
