= Henri-Charles Lambrecht =

19th-century Belgian Catholic Bishop of Ghent

His Excellency Henri-Charles Lambrecht
- Bishop of Ghent
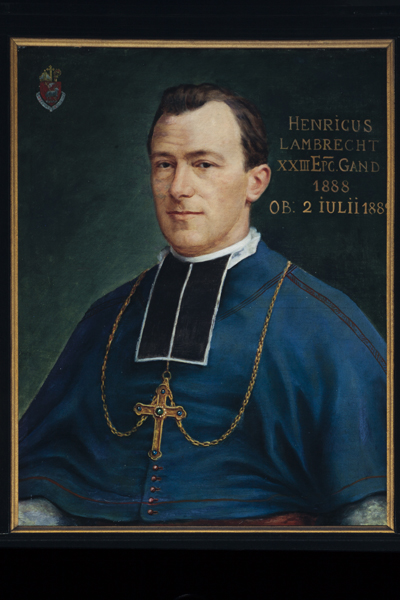
- Diocese: Ghent
- See: St Bavo's
- In office: 1888–1889
- Successor: Antoon Stillemans

Personal details
- Born: 26 January 1848 Welden
- Died: 2 July 1889 (aged 41) Denderleeuw
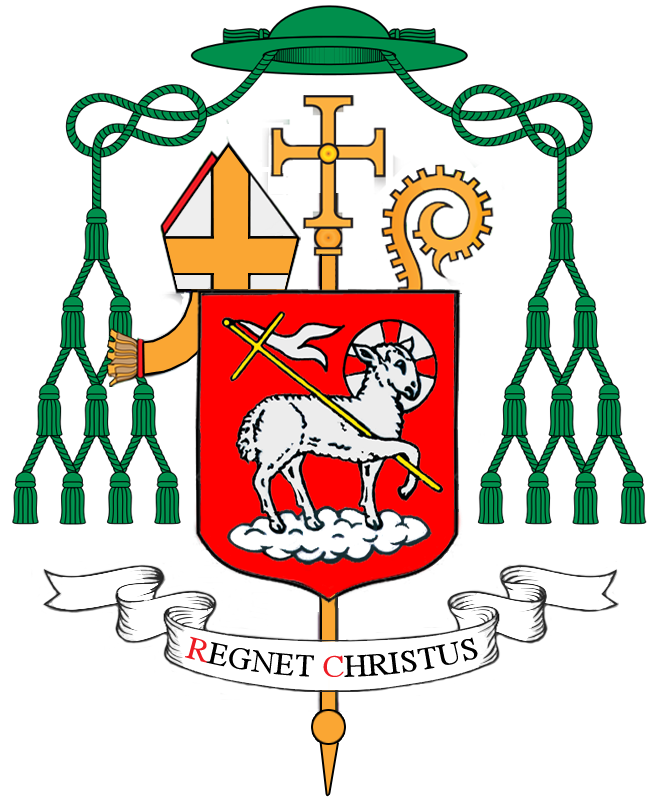
- Coat of arms

Henri-Charles-Camille Lambrecht (1848–1889) was 23rd bishop of Ghent between 1888 and 1889.

Born in a small town near Oudenaarde, Lambrecht was educated in the local school. After his studies in St. Joseph Minor Seminary and the Major Seminary of Ghent, he became Doctor of Sacred Theology at the Catholic University of Leuven, where he also taught. He was appointed to a canonry of St Bavo's Cathedral, Ghent, and served as Vicar General in 1880–1886, when he became coadjutor bishop to Henricus Franciscus Bracq.

== Episcopate ==
Lambrecht became bishop elect after Bracq's death, and was consecrated by Pierre-Lambert Goossens. He died in Denderleeuw, only after one year episcopate. He became ill during episcopal visit, and was buried in his birthplace Welden. He was also Titular Bishop of Geras from 1886 until 1889.

Lambrecht was succeeded by Antoon Stillemans, from Sint-Niklaas.

== See also ==
- Catholic Church in Belgium

Catholic Church titles
Preceded by Henricus Franciscus Bracq	23rd Bishop of Ghent; 1888–1889	Succeeded by Antoon Stillemans
