= Jan Boeksent =

Flemish sculptor

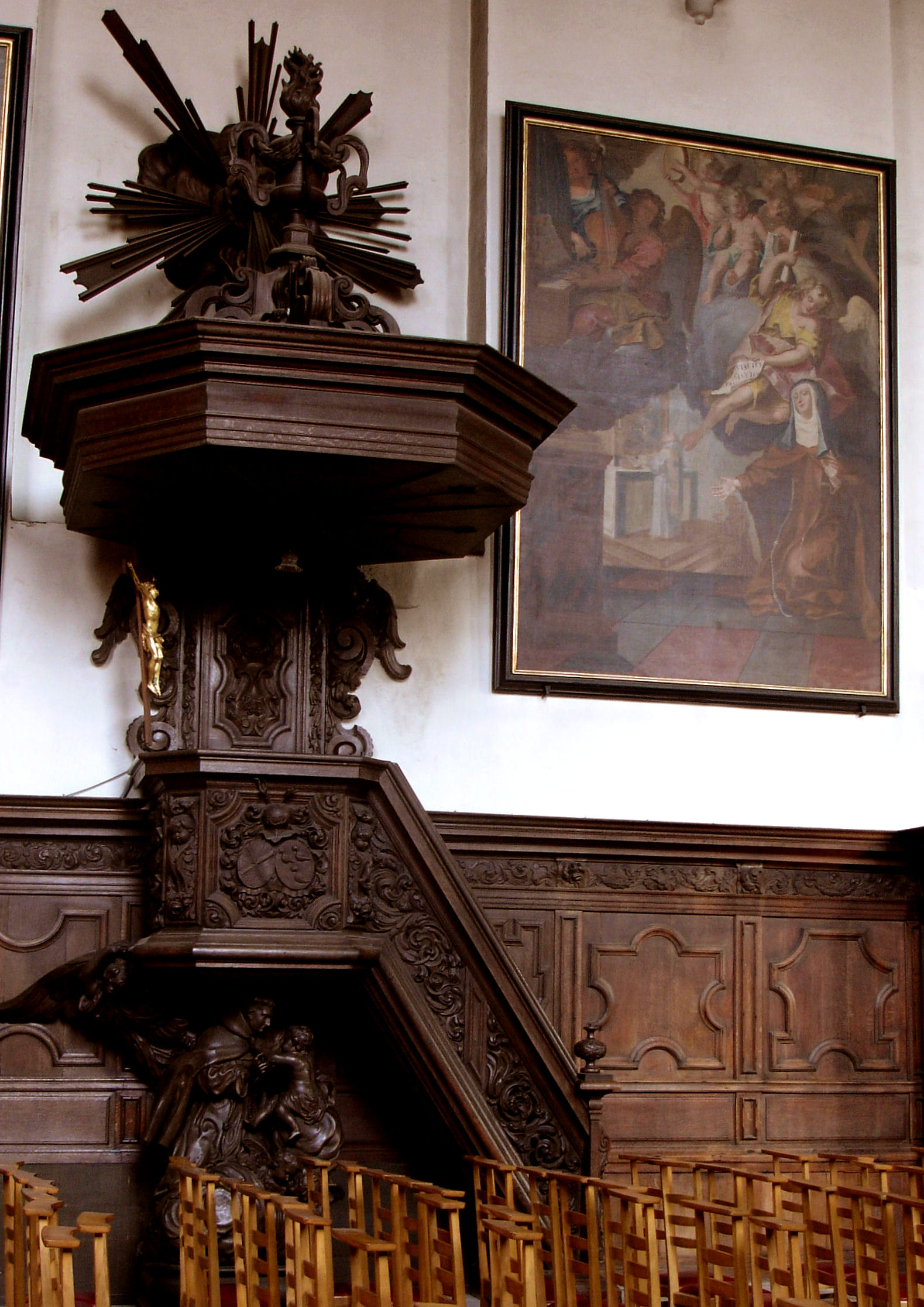
Pulpit, chapel of St. Joseph Minor Seminary

Jan Boeksent (or Joannes Boecksent, OFM 1660–1727) was a Flemish sculptor, famous for his baroque wooden and marble carvings.

He was one of the students of Pieter Verbrugghen I. He was a Franciscan friar, first taking vows in August 1685. He is considered one of the most important sculptors of Flemish baroque carvings. Hendrik Pulinx is mentioned as one of his followers and students. He died in 1727 in the monastery of Ghent.

== Works ==
- St Peter's church, Gent.
- Tomb of Philippus Erardus van der Noot, Ghent Cathedral.
- Sint-Niklaas: St. Joseph Minor Seminary: pulpit, and other carvings.
