= Lippenbroek =

Coordinates: 51°05′11″N 4°10′20″E

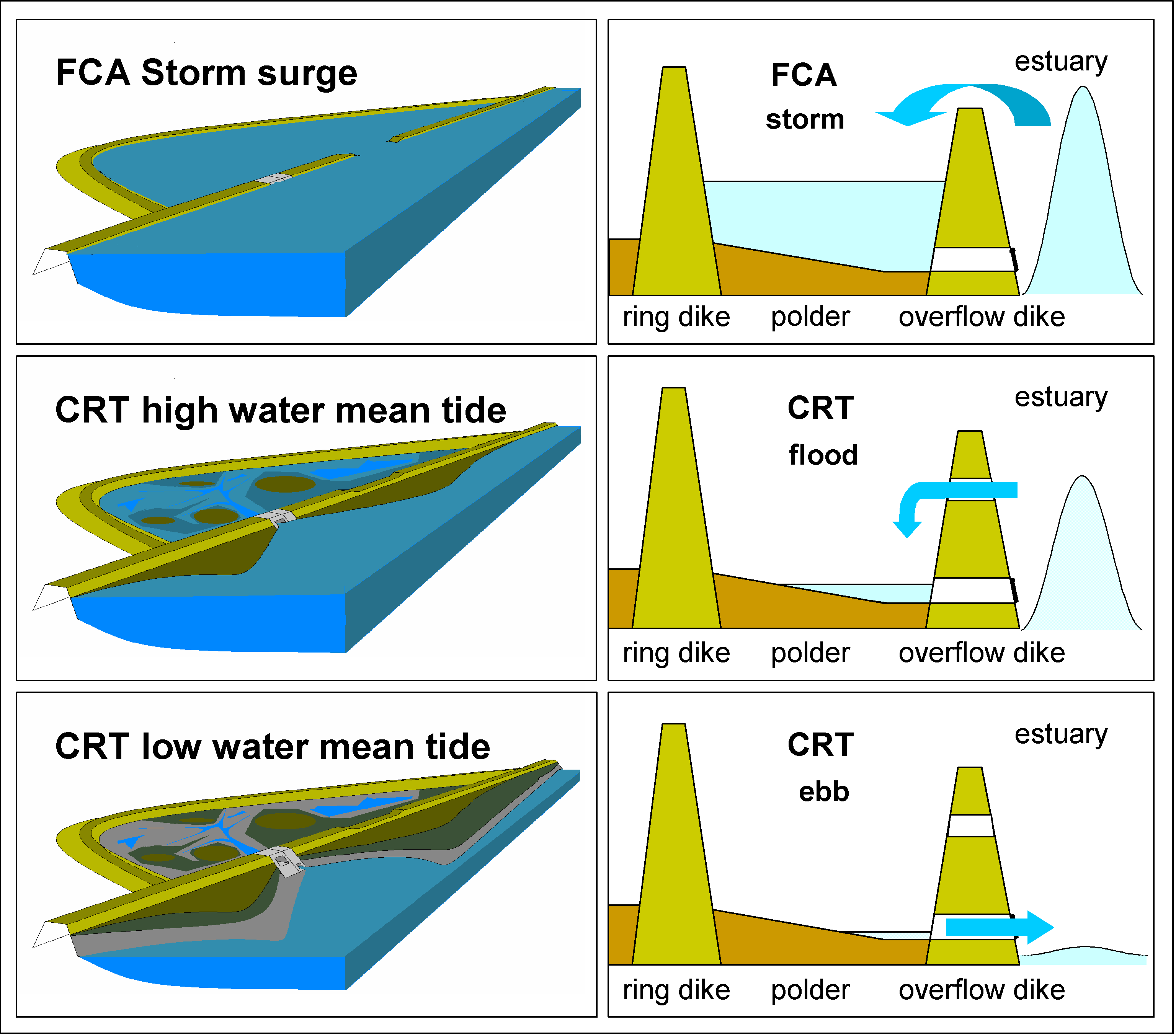
Conceptual sketch of a flood control area with a controlled reduced tide

The Lippenbroek is a former polder in the Belgian freshwater part of the Schelde-estuary, currently functioning as a pilot project for the restoration of intertidal habitat in a densely populated estuary. The area of 10 ha, situated on the territory of the Belgian community of Hamme, started functioning as a flood control area (FCA) in March 2006. Through a construction of sluices, the area is in close contact with the river Schelde: water is flowing in at high tide, and out at low tide. The sluices are designed to obtain a water regime in the area, comparable to the one in natural mudflats and (freshwater) tidal marshes along the Schelde. In this way, the Lippenbroek combines a safety function (protection against extreme spring tide) with a nature development function. In the framework of the Belgian Sigmaplan, aimed at protecting the whole river basin against floods, more areas along the Schelde will be designed similarly. The area has also been seen as a model for flood prevention internationally. The controlled reduced tide procedure has made the area an improved habitat for eels.
