= Cyriel Pennartz =

Dutch neuroscientist (born 1963)

- Born: Cyriel Marie Antoine Pennartz; 7 October 1963 (age 62)
- Education: University of Amsterdam
- Known for: Memory, circadian rhythm perception consciousness
- Awards: Unilever Research Prize (1986)
- Scientific career
- Fields: Systems neuroscience, cognitive neuroscience
- Workplaces: University of Amsterdam
- Doctoral advisor: Fernando Lopes da Silva

Cyriel Marie Antoine Pennartz (born October 7, 1963) is a Dutch neuroscientist serving as professor and head of the Department of Cognitive and Systems Neuroscience at the University of Amsterdam, the Netherlands. He is known for his research on memory, motivation, circadian rhythms, perception and consciousness. Pennartz' work uses a multidisciplinary combination of techniques to understand the relationships between distributed neural activity and cognition, including in vivo electrophysiology and optical imaging, animal behavior and computational modelling.

== Career ==
Pennartz studied biology at Radboud University Nijmegen and University of Amsterdam with specializations in neurobiology, philosophy and computational neuroscience. He obtained his PhD degree in Neuroscience cum laude at the University of Amsterdam under the supervision of Fernando Lopes da Silva and Henk Groenewegen. His PhD project and follow-up research examined the physiology and plasticity of brain circuits involved in memory and motivation, focusing on the hippocampus and ventral striatum.

He proceeded to work on computational models of reinforcement learning as a postdoctoral fellow in Computational Neuroscience at the Department of Physics of Computation of the California Institute of Technology with John Hopfield.

In 1994 he initiated research on the cellular electrophysiology of the brain's circadian clock as tenured group leader at the Netherlands Institute for Brain Research.

He uncovered replay of reward information in the ventral striatum during sleep, using in vivo ensemble recordings made with tetrode arrays, a technique he introduced to the Netherlands in collaboration with Bruce McNaughton and Carol Barnes at the University of Arizona (Tucson, U.S.A.)

In 2003 he was appointed professor in Cognitive and Systems Neuroscience at the University of Amsterdam, where he currently leads a group of ~35 people. His main goal is to advance our understanding of multisensory perception, learning and memory and consciousness by integrating experimental, theoretical and computational approaches to neuroscience. To achieve this, the group develops novel techniques for multi-area electrophysiology, computer simulations of brain processes, analytical tools and causal interventions. Pennartz published a theory on consciousness known as Neurorepresentationalism. Using predictive processing principles, this theory characterizes conscious experience as a multimodally rich, spatially encompassing representation of one's world, including one's own body. Recently his work has been ramifying into the clinical domain, studying disorders of consciousness and memory, and into neurotechnology, developing new methods to combat consequences of stroke.

== Leadership in science and education; honors and awards ==
At the University of Amsterdam, he co-develops curricula and courses in Psychobiology (Bachelor), Biomedical Sciences (Bachelor), Brain and Cognitive Sciences (Master) and founded the Master track Cognitive Neurobiology and Clinical Neurophysiology. At the national level, he served for instance as co-leader of the National Science Agenda section on Brain, Behavior & Cognition (Neurolab.nl) with [Eveline Crone] and [Andrea Evers]. Since 2015, he joined the EU FET Flagship Human Brain Project (HBP) through an open call, and continues to lead HBP's Systems and Cognitive Neuroscience Research. Representing these disciplines, he was elected member of the main governing body of HBP, the Scientific and Infrastructure Board. Pennartz received various awards, grants and honours, for example:

- Unilever Research Prize (1986)
- Postdoctoral Fellowship, Human Frontier Science Program Organization (1993)
- Program Grant, Human Frontier Science Program Organization (2001)
- VICI grant from the Netherlands Organization for Scientific Research (NWO, 2004)
- Program Grant, Senter-Novem (Ministry of Economic Affairs) "Mouse Phenomics" (2004)
- Project Grant, Foundation for Technical Sciences (TTW) for novel neurotechnology (2007)
- Human Brain Project grant, FET Flagship Project, Systems and Cognitive Neuroscience Open Call (2015) and grants in subsequent grant agreements (2017, 2020).

== Bibliography ==
- Pennartz, C. M. A. (2015) The Brain's Representational Power - On Consciousness and the Integration of Modalities. MIT press (382pp.). ISBN 9780262029315
- Pennartz, C. M. A. (2021) The Code of Consciousness. How the Brain Shapes Our Reality. (Dutch: De code van het bewustzijn. Hoe de hersenen onze werkelijkheid vormgeven). Prometheus (349 pp.). ISBN 9789044631913
