= Louis Courtois (illusionist) =

Belgian illusionist (1785–1859)

Louis Courtois, also known as Papa Courtois (Waasmunster, 28 October 1785 – Paris, November 1859), was a Belgian illusionist who performed in several European countries, including at the courts of the kings of France, Belgium and the Netherlands.

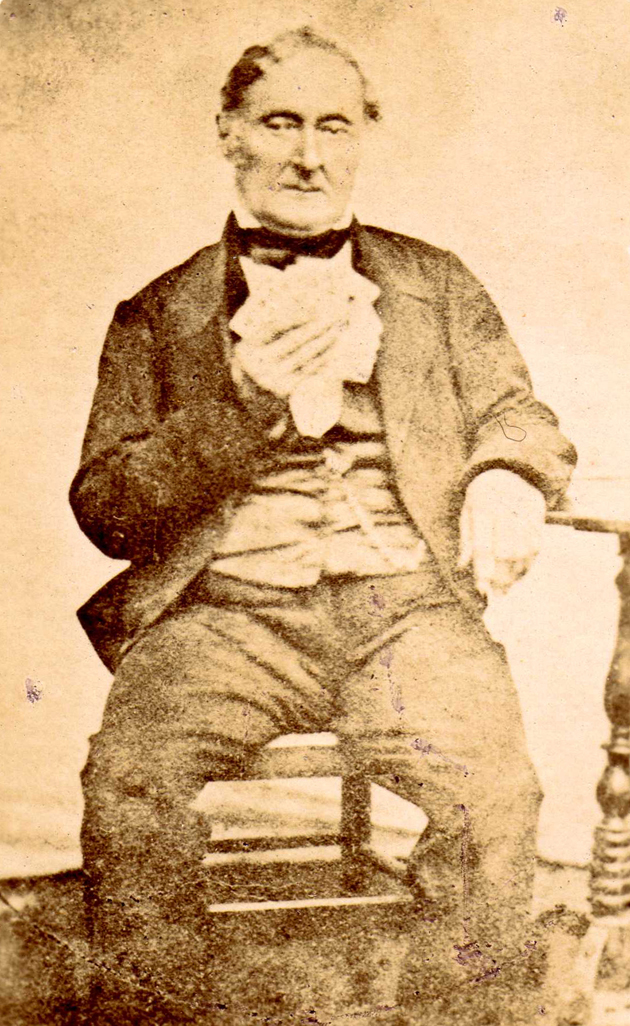
Portrait of Louis Courtois, ca. 1859

Louis learned magic from his father Jacques François, who had also performed in Belgium and the Netherlands. He started his own company with his wife, Marie-Jeanne Vangele, in 1812.

He obtained great fame with his shows where birds, bowls and coins appeared and disappeared in the theaters where he performed. He also introduced magical tricks from India and Egypt, and supplemented his shows with juggling performances.

Between 1813 and 1834, he and Marie-Jeanne had 18 children. Fourteen of them eventually became professional magicians, and in 1850 "Papa Courtois" formed a company with ten of them, the Courtois Family Theater, which generated considerable curiosity.

The most well known among his children was Julienne-Reine, who called herself Julie Courtois (1813–1880). She married another Belgian illusionist, André-Joseph Grandsart (1813–1882). The couple founded a company called The Grandsart-Courtois Theater, which performed all over Europe. The Courtois Family Theater was continued after Papa Courtois' death by his son Antoine-Léonard Courtois (1823–1901), who married Euphrosine Picolo, daughter of the Italian acrobat Jean-Baptiste Picolo (1790–1871), whose "Théâtre Picolo" had become well known in France.
