= Antoon Stillemans =

Bishop of Ghent from 1890 to 1916

His Excellency Antoine Stillemans
- Bishop of Ghent
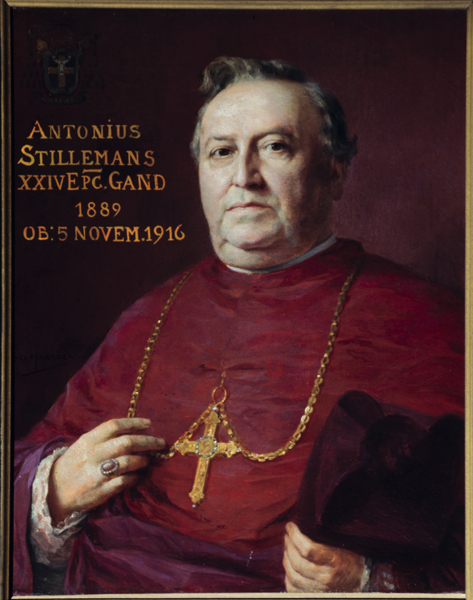
- Diocese: Ghent
- See: St Bavo's
- Predecessor: Henri-Charles Lambrecht
- Successor: Emilius Seghers
- Other post: Superior of the St. Joseph Minor Seminary

Orders
- Ordination: 20 September 1856
- Consecration: 27 January 1890

Personal details
- Born: 10 December 1832 Sint-Niklaas, East Flanders, Belgium
- Died: 5 November 1916 (aged 83)
- Buried: Ghent
- Motto: Vivat Jesus!
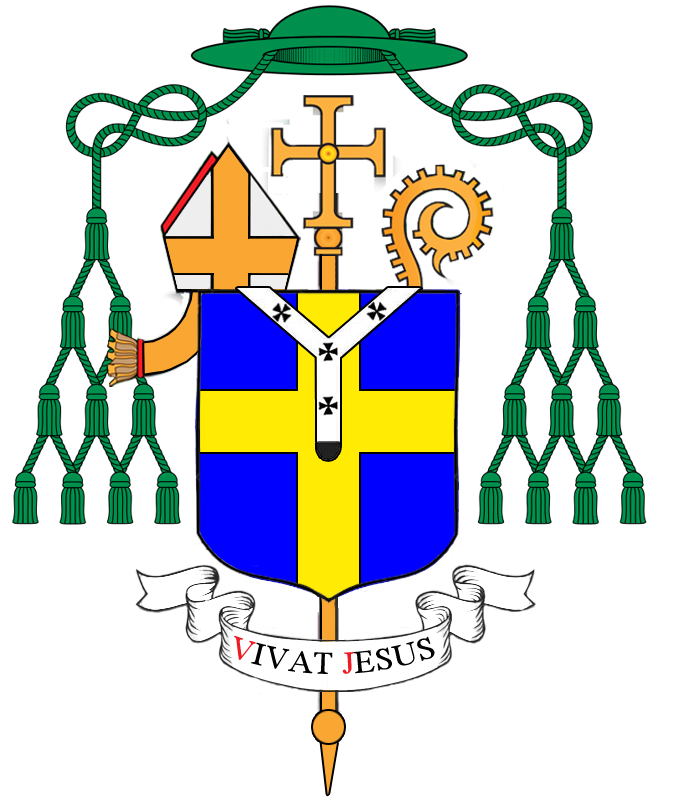
- Coat of arms

Antoon Stillemans (10 December 1832, Sint-Niklaas – 5 November 1916, Ghent) was for 26 years the twenty-fourth bishop of Ghent, in Belgium.

== Education ==
Stillemans began studies at the St. Joseph Minor Seminary of Sint-Niklaas in 1846. In 1853 he enrolled at the major seminary in Ghent, earning a doctoral degree in philosophy at the University of Leuven in 1860. Stillemans' brother, Pierre-Louis Stillemans, also became a priest.

== Career ==
He was named in 1867 Superior of the St. Joseph Minor Seminary of Sint-Niklaas, for 21 years. He became president of the Major seminary in 1888 and canon of the cathedral chapter of Ghent and member of the episcopal council. He was canon elect after the sudden death of Henri-Charles Lambrecht. He promoted the Gothic Revival, and had the current Episcopal Palace in Ghent restyled as well building a new major seminary in Ghent.

He named his brother Pierre-Louis Stillemans an honorary canon of St-Bavo.

In 1899, under pressure from the royal court and Minister Woeste, he suspended Adolf Daens, a radical priest in Aalst. He promoted the social cultural movement of Flanders. In 1902 he consecrated the new church attached to Dendermonde Abbey. In 1906, he celebrated his golden jubilee as priest and, in 1914, his silver jubilee as bishop of Ghent. He was honored with the sacred pallium with papal permission at the end of his career. A street was named in his honor in Sint-Niklaas, as well as a stained-glass window inside the town hall, he gifted Sint-Niklaas with a large copy of his portrait. The colors of the city, blue and yellow are reflected in his heraldic episcopal crest.

After his death he left his crosier to the main church of Sint-Niklaas where he was baptized. He was succeeded by Mgr. Emilius Seghers.

== Honours ==
- 7 October 1889: Honorary Doctorate from the Catholic University of Leuven.
- 1895: Officer in the Order of Leopold.
- 14 November 1901: Papal Domestic Prelate, and assistant of the pontifical throne.
- 30 November 1911: pallium by pontifical dispensation.

Catholic Church titles
Preceded by Henri-Charles Lambrecht	24th Bishop of Ghent; 1890–1916	Succeeded by Emilius Seghers
