= Waasmunster =

- Municipality
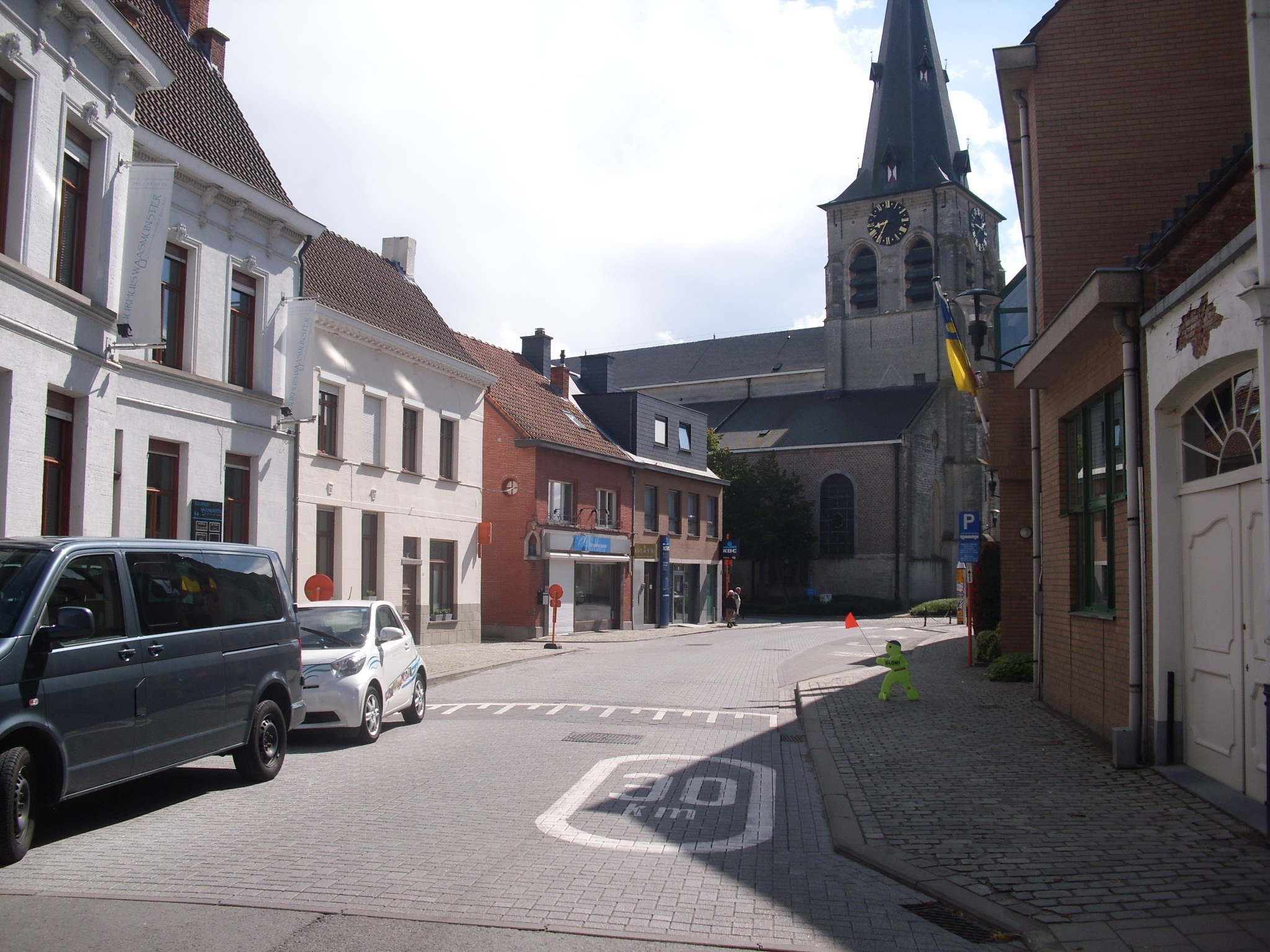

- Flag Coat of arms

- Location of Waasmunster in East Flanders
- Interactive map of Waasmunster
- Location in Belgium
- Coordinates: 51°06′35″N 04°05′05″E
- Country: Belgium
- Community: Flemish Community
- Region: Flemish Region
- Province: East Flanders
- Arrondissement: Dendermonde

Government
  - Mayor: Jurgen Bauwens (CD&V)
  - Governing party: CD&V/N-VA

Area
  - Total: 32.27 km^{2} (12.46 sq mi)

Population (2018-01-01)
  - Total: 10,768
  - Density: 333.7/km^{2} (864.2/sq mi)
- Postal codes: 9250
- NIS code: 42023
- Area codes: 052, 09, 03
- Website: www.waasmunster.be

Waasmunster (Dutch pronunciation: [ˌʋaːsˈmʏnstər]) is a municipality located in the Flemish province of East Flanders, in Belgium. The municipality only comprises the town of Waasmunster proper. In 2021, Waasmunster had a total population of 10,912. The total area is 31.93 km^{2}.

Roosenberg Abbey, founded in the 13th century, is situated here.

Illusionist Louis Courtois, writer Cyriel Geerinck, football manager and scout Urbain Haesaert and DJ/music producers Eptic and Beaney were born in Waasmunster.
