= Hamme =

- Municipality
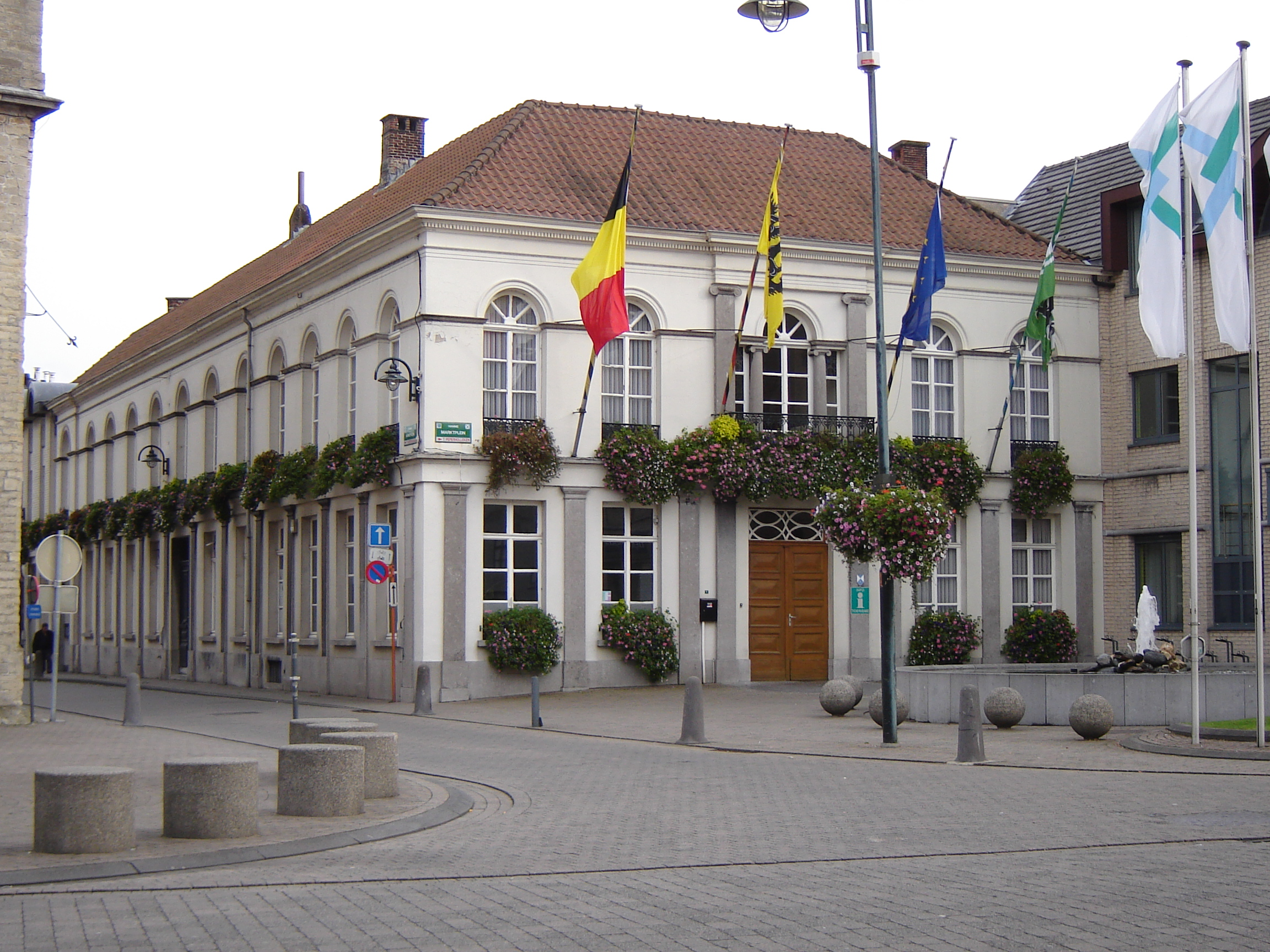
- Town hall

- Flag Coat of arms

- Location of Hamme in East Flanders
- Interactive map of Hamme
- Location in Belgium
- Coordinates: 51°05′N 04°08′E
- Country: Belgium
- Community: Flemish Community
- Region: Flemish Region
- Province: East Flanders
- Arrondissement: Dendermonde

Government
  - Mayor: Lotte Peeters (NVA)
  - Governing parties: CD&V, Vooruit, N-VA

Area
  - Total: 40.53 km^{2} (15.65 sq mi)

Population (2018-01-01)
  - Total: 24,829
  - Density: 612.6/km^{2} (1,587/sq mi)
- Postal codes: 9220
- NIS code: 42008
- Area codes: 052
- Website: www.hamme.be

Hamme (Dutch pronunciation: [ˈɦɑmə]) is a municipality located in the Belgian province of East Flanders. The municipality comprises the settlements of Hamme proper, Kastel Moerzeke, Sint-Anna and Zogge. In 2018, Hamme had a total population of 24,827. The total area is 40.21 km². The current mayor of Hamme is Herman Vijt, from the CD&V (Christian Democratic) party.

== Folklore ==
Hamme also has its own legends, most famously that of the "Hamse Wuiten". The people of Hamme are also called Hamse Wuitens. The "Hamse wuiten" is also the main mascot in a street parade at the end of March every year. The inhabitants dress up and build big trucks with giant puppets, making fun of local and national politicians and scandals.

== Sport ==
In 1967 Hamme born Ferdinand Bracke was voted Belgian Sportsman of the Year (the first in history to receive this award) and was also awarded the Belgian Sports Merit Award

The 6th stage of the X²O Badkamers Trophy 2023–24 UCI Cyclo-cross season was held at Hamme on 27 January 2024. Fem Van Empel took 1st place.

== Transport ==
Hamme is located near the N41 road and E17, providing quick access to nearby cities Dendermonde and Sint-Niklaas, but also some more distant locations such as Antwerp and Ghent.

== Notable inhabitants ==
- Ferdinand Bracke, cyclist
- Herman Brusselmans, writer
- Amaat Joos, Canon and antropologue
- Linde Merckpoel, radio presenter
- Frans Van Damme, painter
- Benoît Van Uytvanck, sculptor
- Kristel Verbeke, singer
- Hanne Verbruggen, singer
- Petrus Vertenten, missionary and portraitist
- Annelien Van Wauwe (*1987), clarinetist

== See also ==
- Lippenbroek
