= St. Joseph Minor Seminary =

Catholic secondary school in Sint-Niklaas, Diocese of Ghent, Belgium

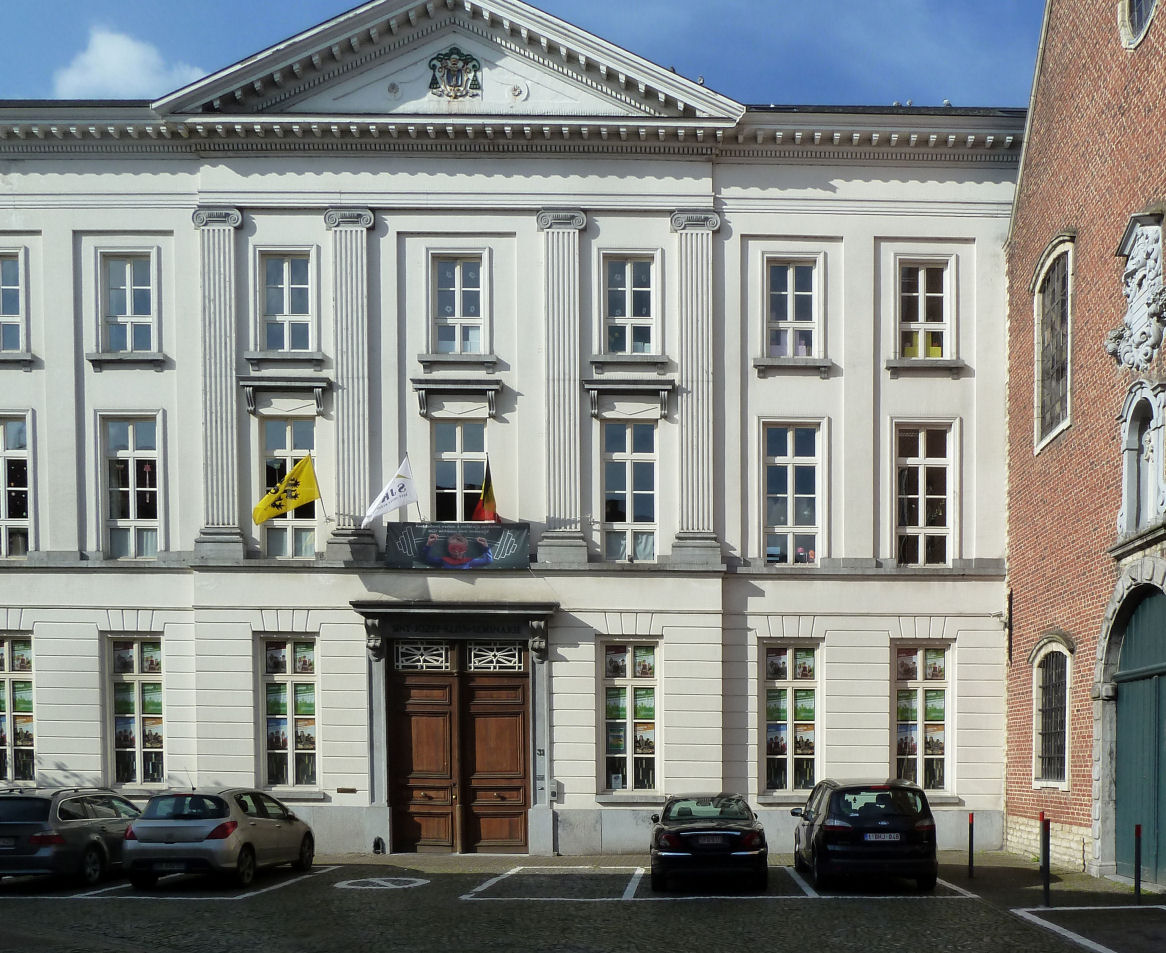
18th century facade

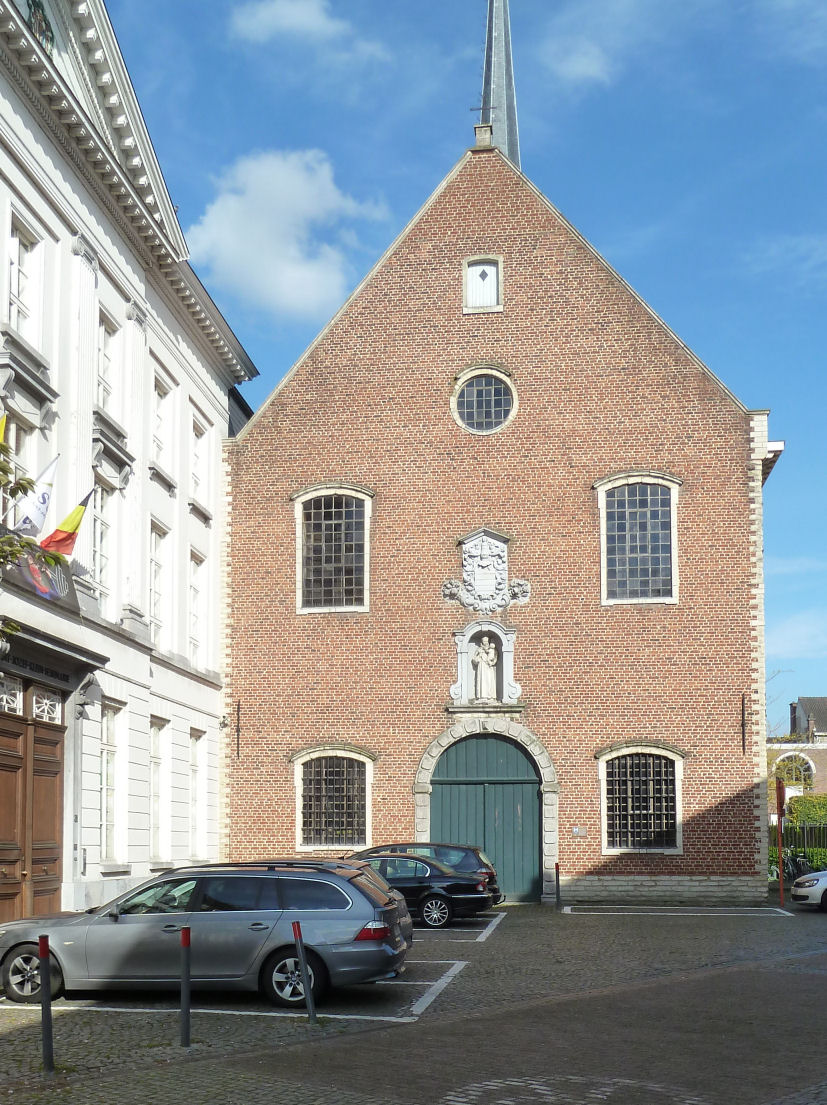
Facade of the Church

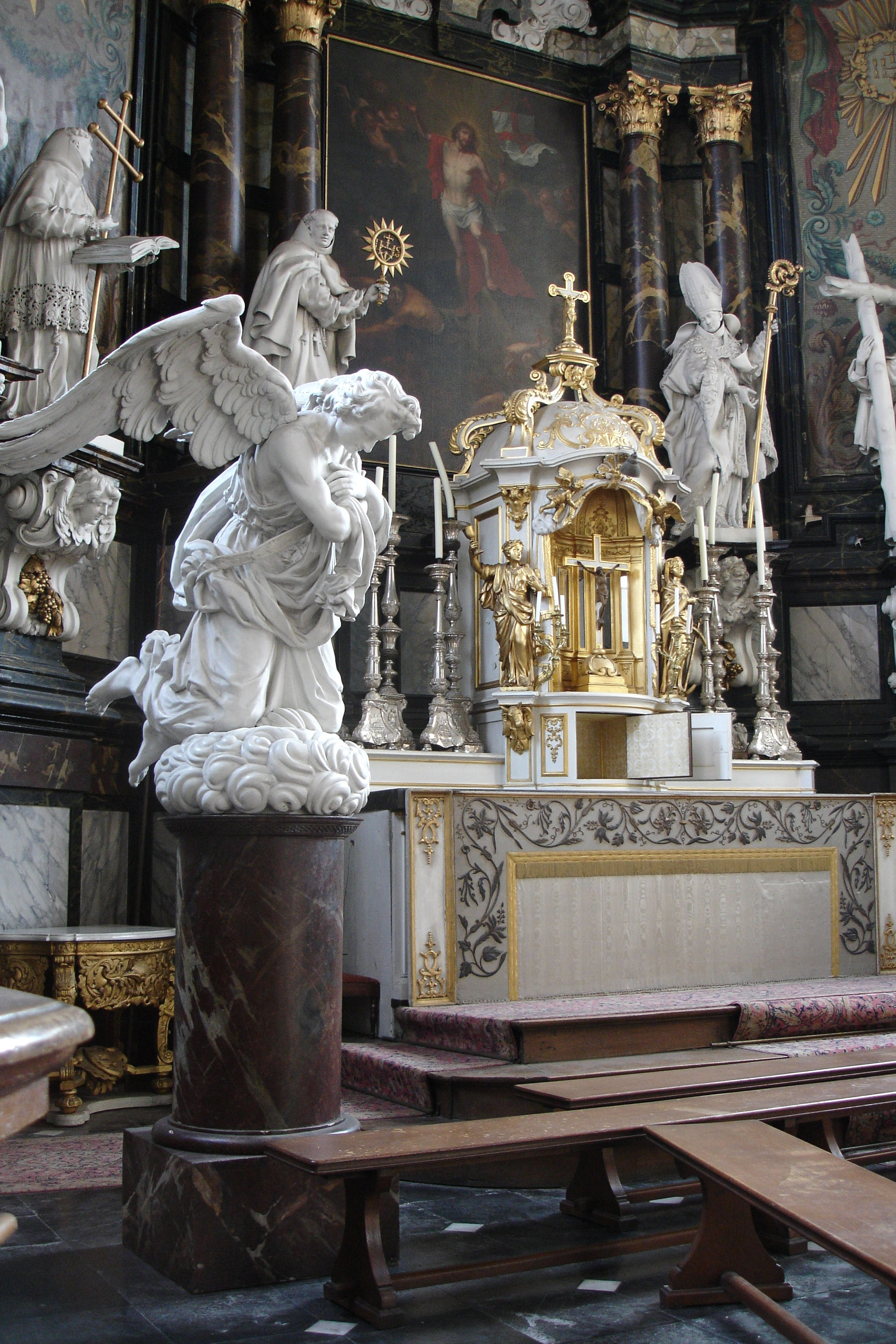
Carvings of Jan Boeksent in the Church

St. Joseph Minor Seminary (Sint-Jozef Klein Seminarie or SJKS) is a Catholic secondary school in Sint-Niklaas, Diocese of Ghent, Belgium. There were previously a Recollect monastery and a seminary on the site.

== History ==
The first buildings were built starting April 1689, the friars were authorised to found the second monastery in the city. The Chapel of Saint Anthony was completed in 1692 and in 1696 Bishop Philips Erard van der Noot, bishop of Ghent consecrated the church, in baroque style and famous for the major carvings of Jan Boeksent. The friars lived there in the conventual buildings until the French Revolution and the French occupation of Belgium. After they were chased out they never returned. It was later sold to Bishop Maurice-Jean de Broglie who converted the old monastery into a Minor seminary dedicated to Saint Joseph. Many important priests were educated here. For the centenary of the school in 1908, Pope Pius X sent his personal pontifical blessing.

Today the seminary has gone, and the building is now part of the Catholic secondary school property of the diocese. At the end of the last century the old main staircase went up in flames. The church was saved from the fire.

== Notable teachers and students ==
=== Bishops ===
- Honoré Jozef Coppieters, bishop of Ghent.
- Henri-Charles Lambrecht, bishop of Ghent.
- Oscar Joliet, bishop of Ghent.
- Antoon Stillemans, bishop of Ghent.
- Gustaaf Joos, Cardinal and bishop of Ypres.
- Henry Gabriels, bishop of Ogdensburg, New York.
- Augustine Van de Vyver, bishop of Richmond, Virginia.

=== Others ===
- Amaat Joos
- Camil Van Hulse
- Blessed Edward Poppe
- Anton van Wilderode
