= Roosenberg Abbey =

- Abdij van Roosenberg
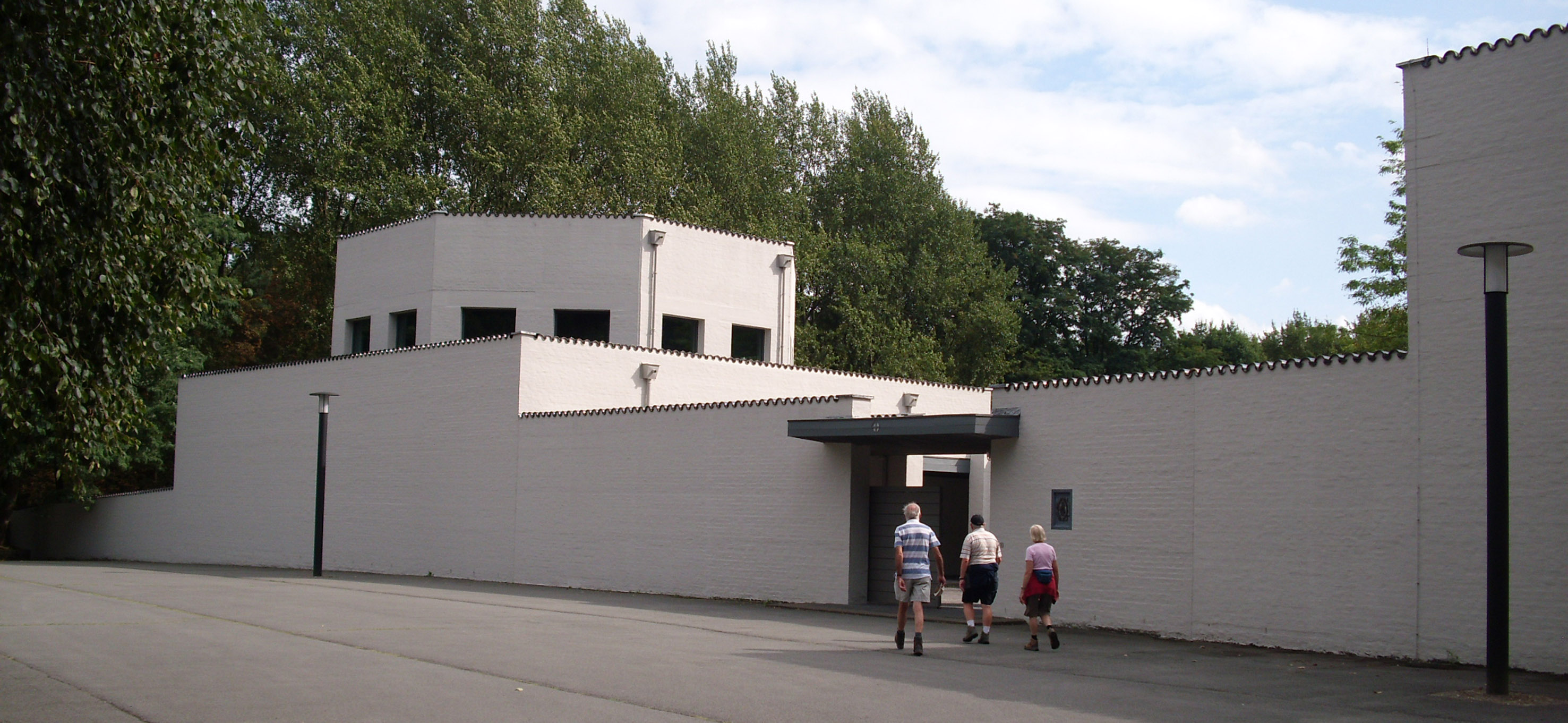

- Location within Belgium

General information
- Location: Waasmunster, East Flanders, Belgium
- Coordinates: 51°7′10″N 4°4′35″E

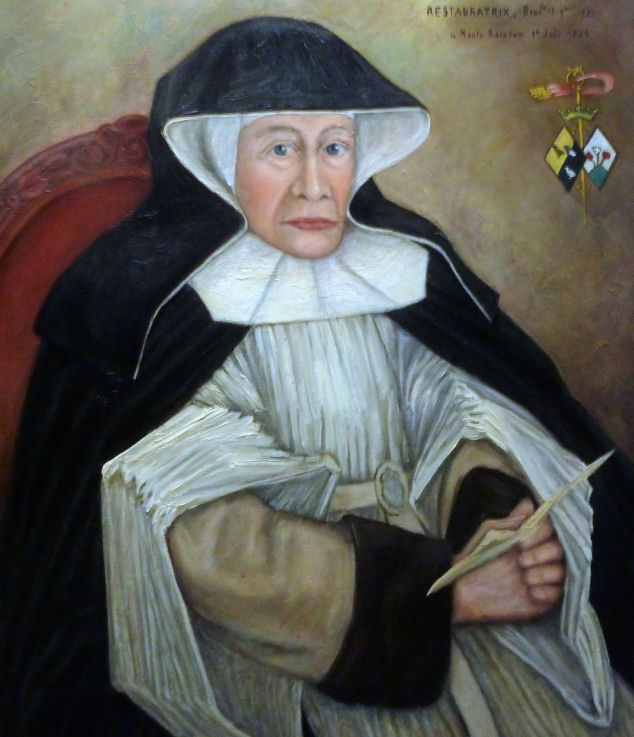
Abbess Joanna van Doorselaer de ten Ryen.

Roosenberg Abbey was established in 1238 at Waasmunster, halfway between Ghent and Antwerp. The abbey is still operating at Waasmunster, though not on its original site. Its 750-year history has not been uninterrupted.

Today the focus of its spirituality is "Marian and Franciscan".

== History ==
From the beginning the abbey was occupied by "Victorines" or Canonesses Regular of St. Victor who lived by the Rule of St. Augustine. In the 1970s, with the number of vocations in Flanders reducing, the Victorine community was merged with a group of Franciscan sisters, and Roosenberg should now be regarded as a Franciscan community.

=== First site ===
The original Roosenberg Abbey was founded in 1237–38 on the banks of the River Durme. Its establishment was mandated by Walter van Marvis, Bishop of Tournai, and it was from Tournai that the founding group of canonesses was sent. It is noted by contemporary sources that the Bishop was also inspired by Francis of Assisi whom he had evidently met in connection with the Fifth Crusade.

In 1379 and 1459 the abbey was destroyed by citizens from nearby Ghent, and it was also burned down in 1419. It was destroyed during the Eighty Years' War, in 1578 by Calvinists. On each occasion it was rebuilt, however. A more final ending seemed to have been reached with the French Revolution, when the abbey property was nationalised and the buildings used as a barracks. The abbey was then destroyed (again) in 1797. By this time, however, the Abbess Anna Maria de Crombrugge, displaying remarkable prescience, had succeeded in removing and safeguarding many of the abbey's valuable manuscripts and other important documents.

=== Second site ===
In 1831 the abbey was re-established in a new building in Waasmunster's Church Street on the initiative of the abbess (as she became) Johanna van Doorselaer van ten Ryen (1782–1863). She used her considerable wealth to purchase several small contiguous houses which she replaced to create a new Roosenberg Abbey where she gathered surviving sisters from the old days and younger novitiates. Till 1970 Roosenberg flourished at Church Street 32 (Kerkstraat nummer 32).

=== Third site ===
Agreeing to the bishop's request to merge with a Franciscan community as a response to a falling-off in vocations gave rise to the need for a new site. In 1975 Roosenberg moved to its present site along the "Oudeheerweg-Heide" road. The unapologetically functional building is the work of the Benedictine architect, Hans van der Laan.

The abbey is open to individuals and groups wishing to deepen their Christian belief and in search of contemplative silence.
