= Benoît Van Uytvanck =

Belgian sculptor

- Born: 25 June 1857; Hamme, East Flanders, Belgium
- Died: 6 November 1927 (aged 70)
- Known for: Religious sculptures, restoration of sculptures
- Style: Gothic Revival

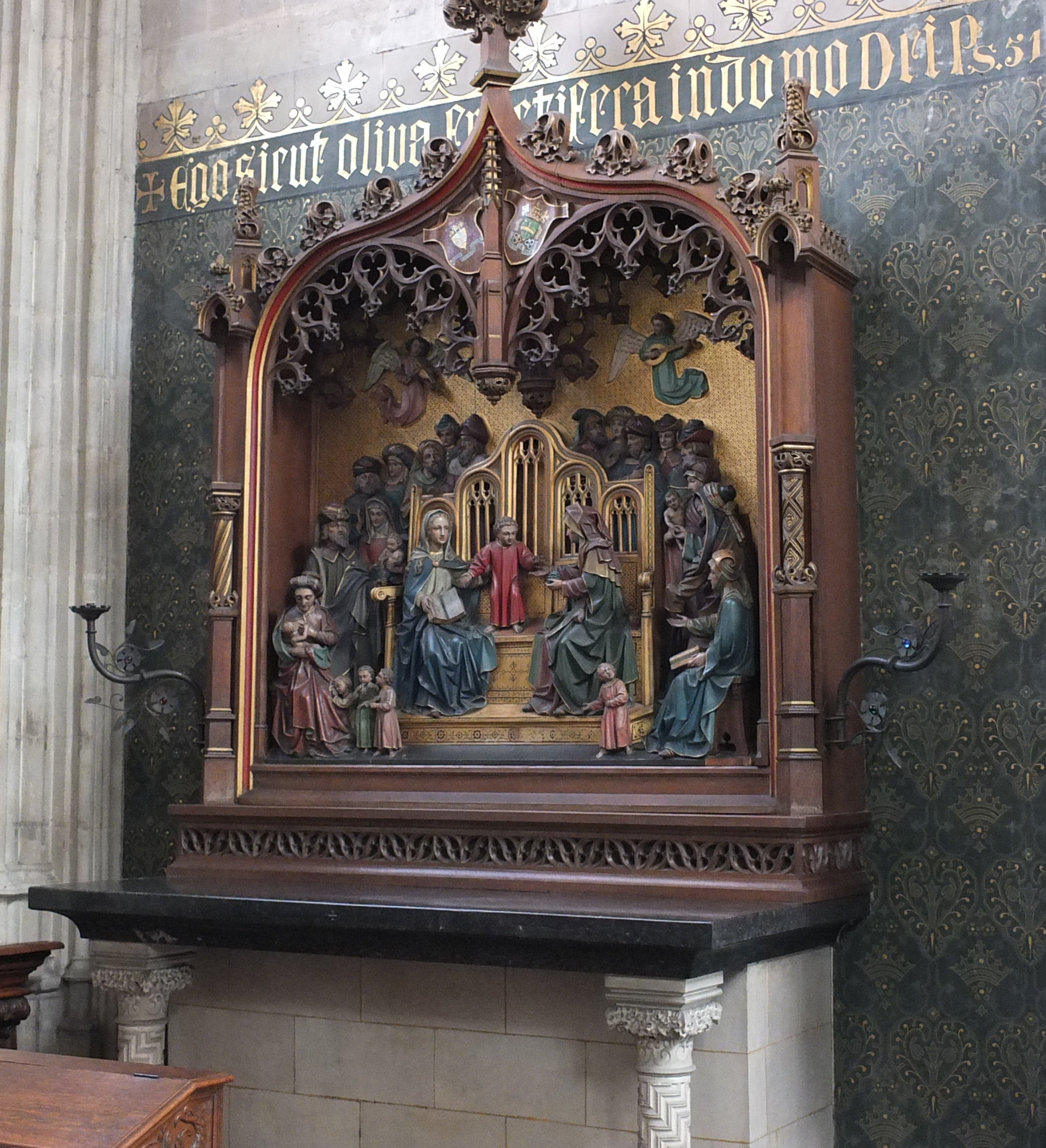
The Virginity of Saint Anne, polychrome wooden retable, 1903, Onze-Lieve-Vrouw-over-de-Dijlekerk

Benoît Van Uytvanck (25 June 1857 – 6 November 1927) was a Belgian sculptor.

== Life and work ==
Van Uytvanck was born on 25 June 1857 in Hamme, East Flanders, Belgium.

He was a pupil of Jean-Baptiste Bethune. He became a sculptor chiefly of religious subjects. Van Uytvanck also worked as a restorer of sculptures. As such he was most active in the churches in Leuven and Mechelen. His work was often discussed in the Bulletin des Métiers d'Art. His style has been described as a "sober and less dogmatic interpretation of the Gothic Revival". In 1903 he completed an ornate tabernacle (Sacramentstoren) in white stone, as well statues of Mary and Saint John and an altarpiece of Saint Anne in polychrome wood for the Onze-Lieve-Vrouw-over-de-Dijlekerk of Mechelen. In 1909 he completed a Neo-Gothic altarpiece of The Seven Sorrows of Our Lady for the same church.

He had an atelier in Leuven, dealing mainly with church furnishings.

== Gallery ==
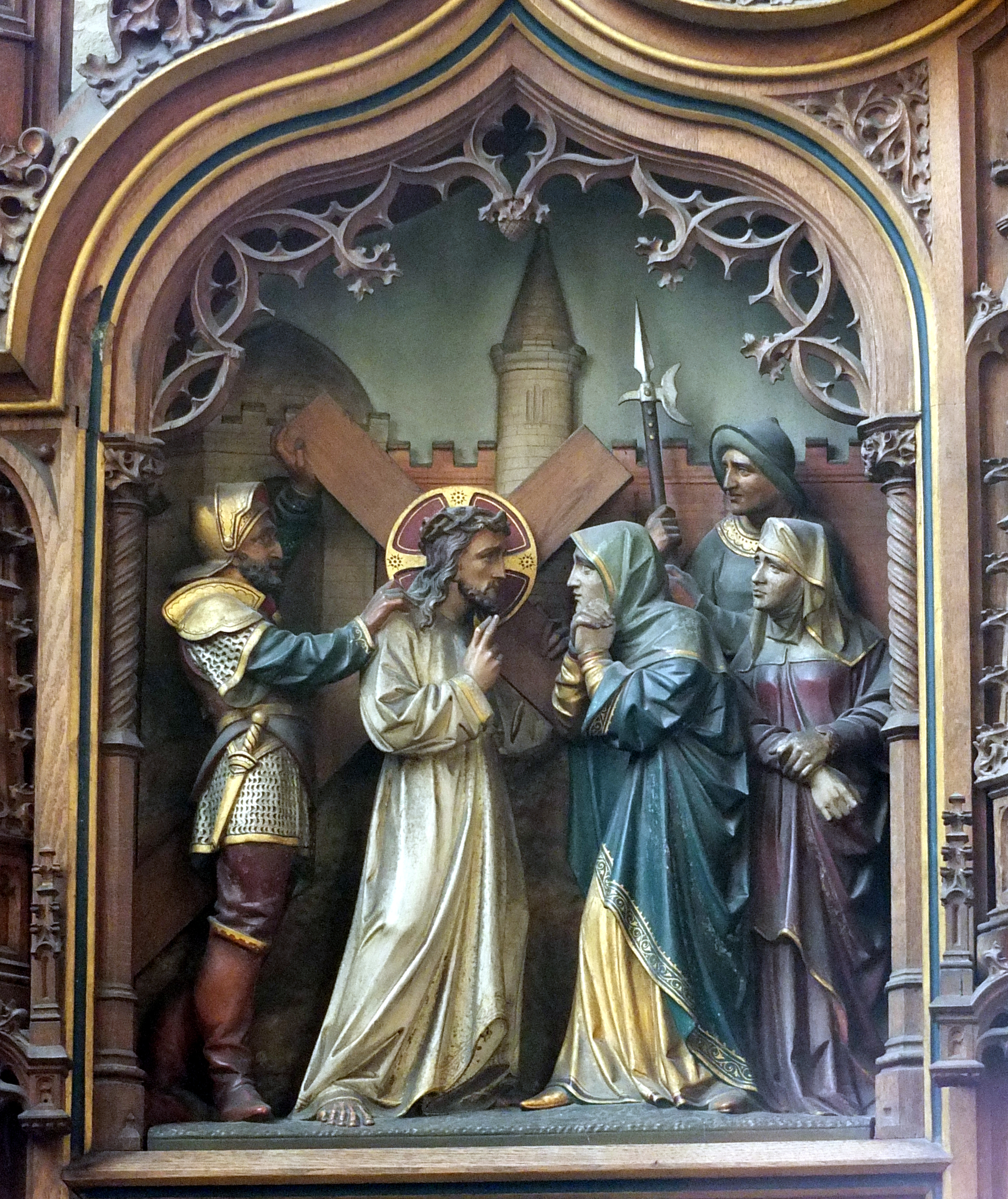
Mary meets Jesus on the way to Calvary, 1909, Onze-Lieve-Vrouw-over-de-Dijlekerk, Mechelen

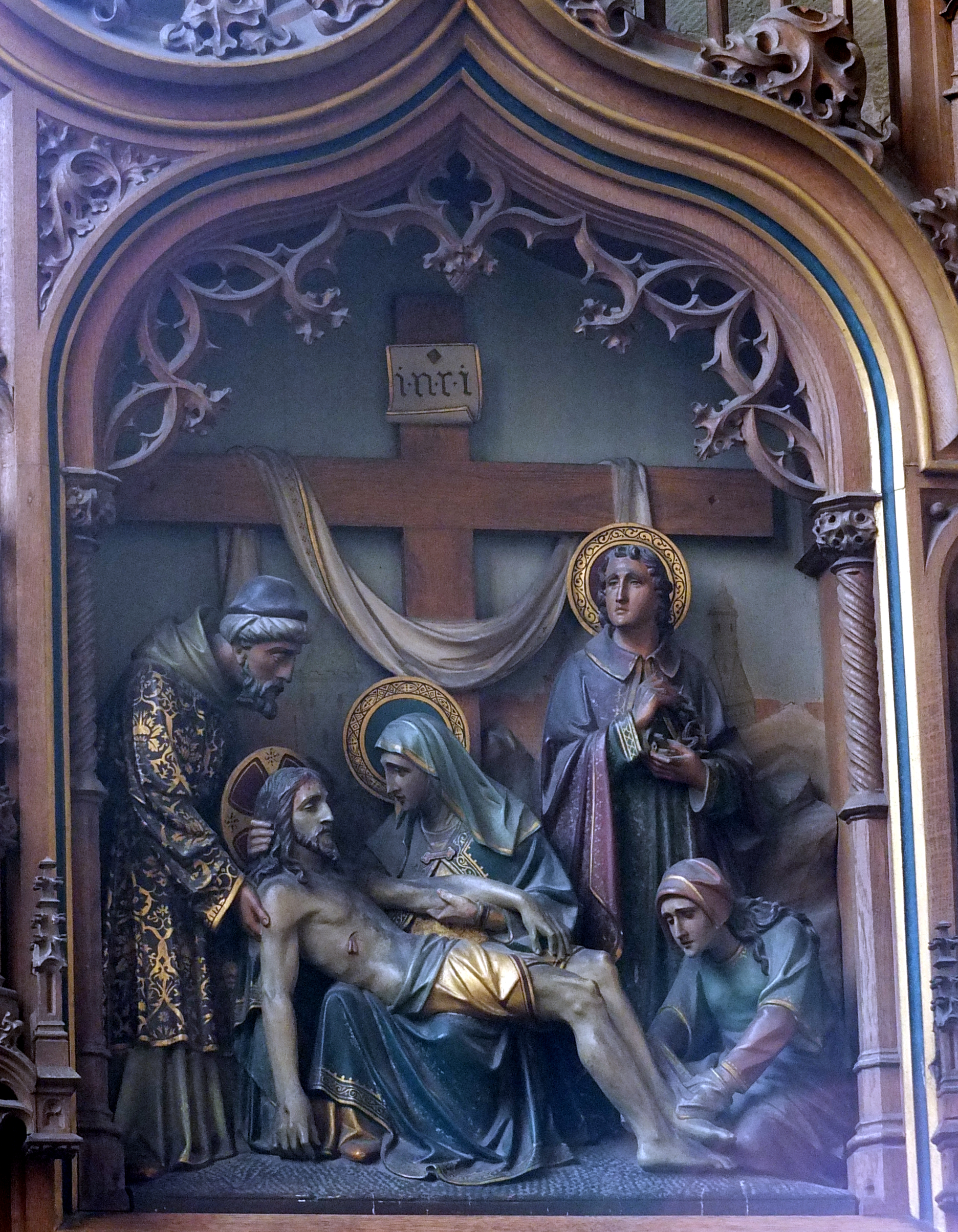
Mary receives the body of Jesus in her arms, 1909, Onze-Lieve-Vrouw-over-de-Dijlekerk, Mechelen

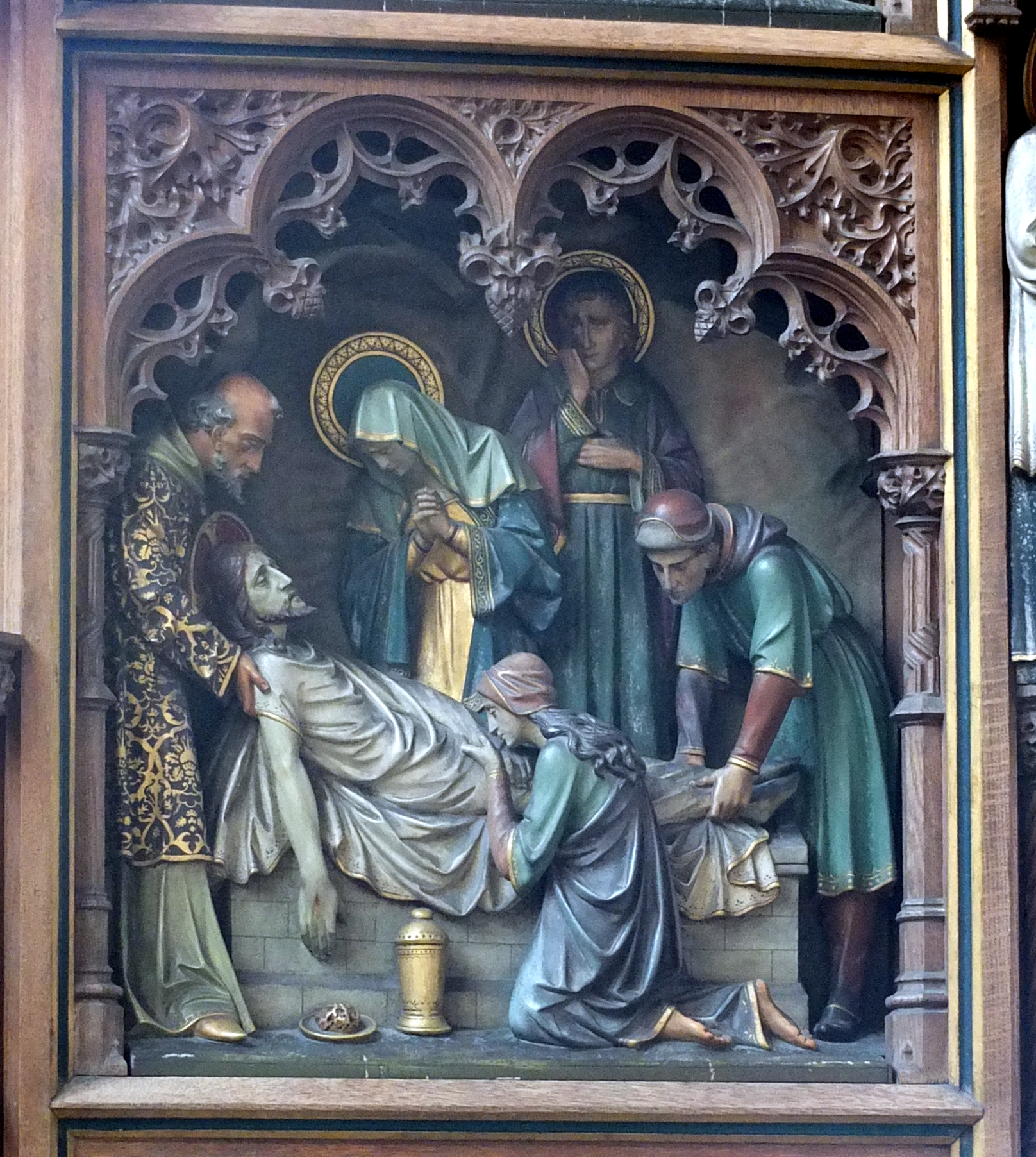
The body of Jesus is placed in the tomb, 1909, Onze-Lieve-Vrouw-over-de-Dijlekerk, Mechelen

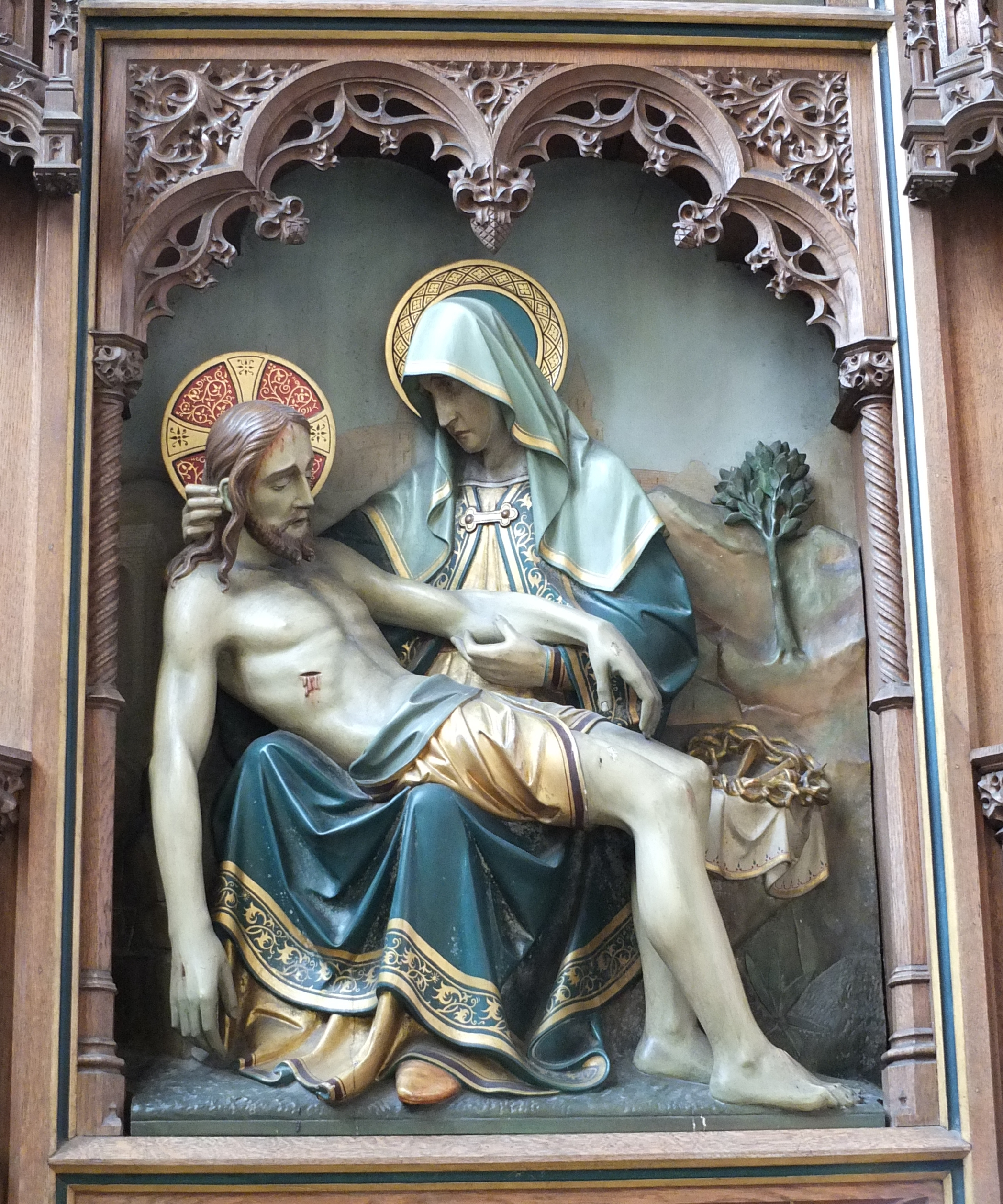
Mary receives the body of Jesus in her arms, 1909, Onze-Lieve-Vrouw-over-de-Dijlekerk, Mechelen

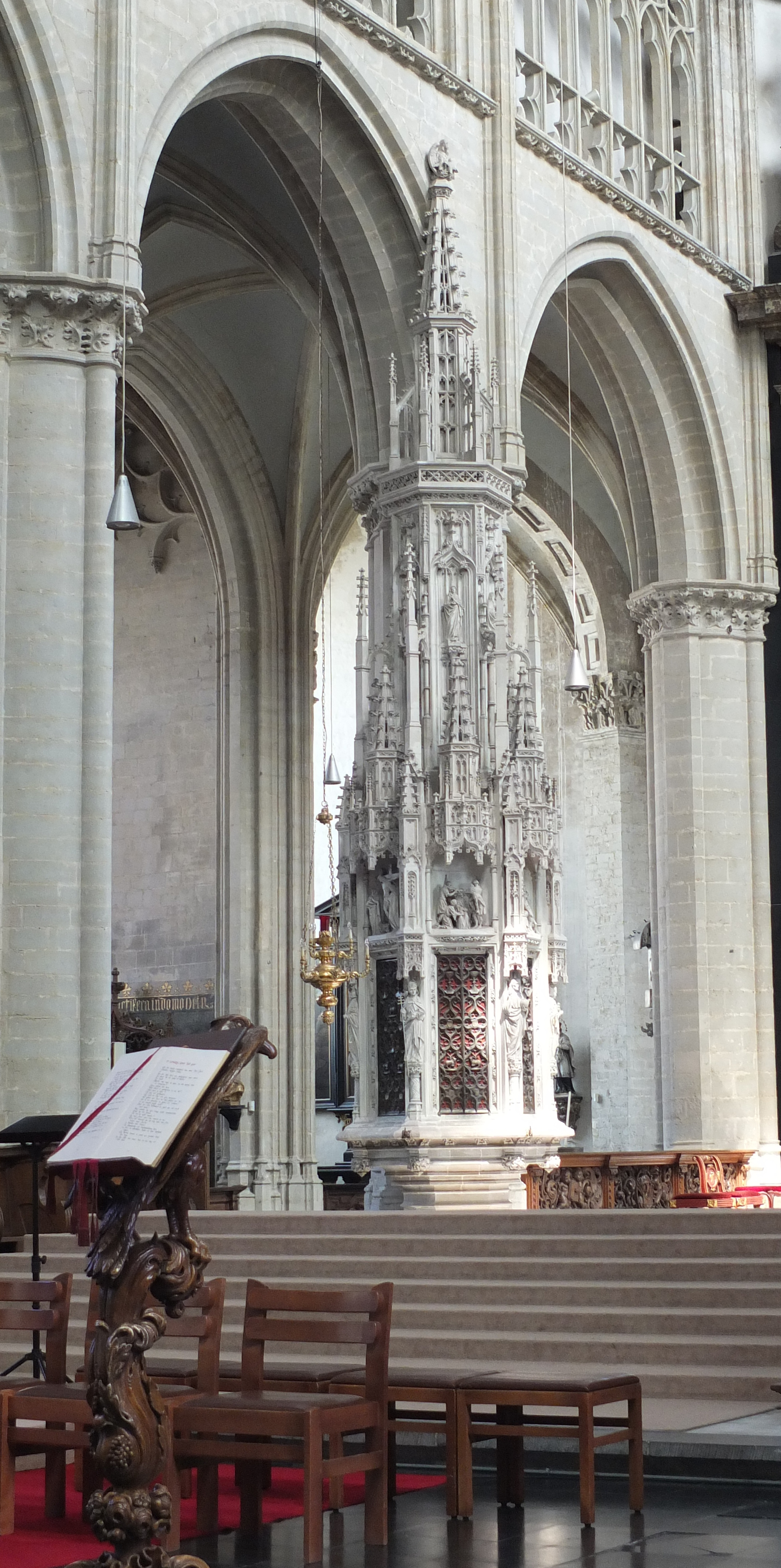
Ornate tabernacle (Sacramentstoren), 1903, Onze-Lieve-Vrouw-over-de-Dijlekerk, Mechelen
