= Anton van Wilderode =

Belgian diocesan priest, teacher, writer and poet

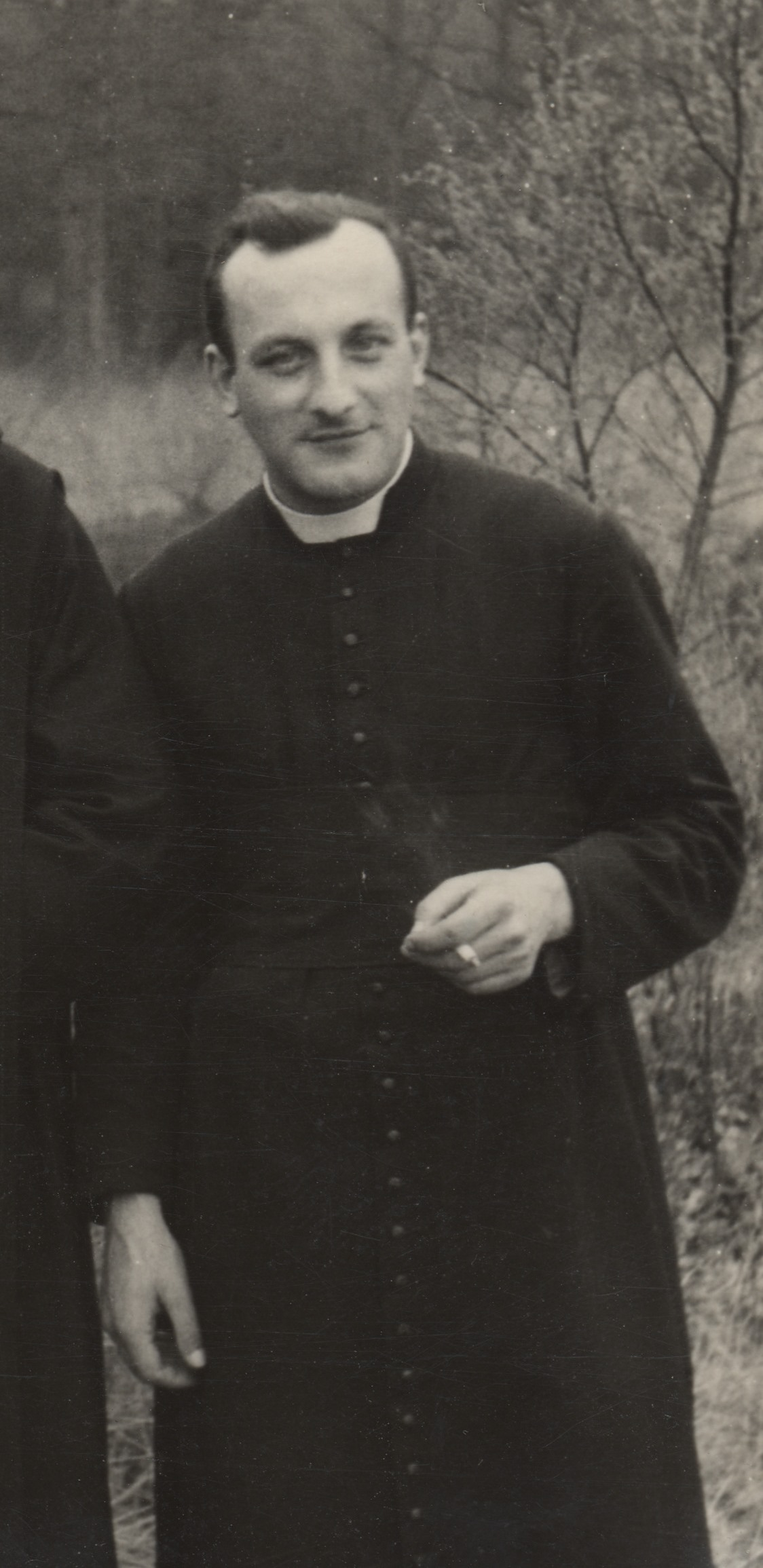
- Van Wilderode (ca.1938)
- Born: Cyriel Paul Coupé; 28 June 1918; Moerbeke-Waas, Belgium
- Died: 15 June 1998 (aged 79); Sint-Niklaas, Belgium
- Occupations: poet, writer

Cyriel Paul Coupé (1918–1998) was a Belgian diocesan priest, teacher, writer and poet, also known by the pseudonym Anton van Wilderode.

== Life ==
Coupé was born in Moerbeke-Waas on 28 June 1918. He was ordained as a priest on 21 May 1944 in the Diocese of Ghent. He graduated in Classical philology at the Catholic University of Leuven. From 1946 until his retirement in 1982, he worked as a teacher in Sint-Niklaas at the St. Joseph Minor Seminary. Among his pupils were Paul Snoek and Tom Lanoye.

He made his literary debut in 1939, with the short story Dis al ("This is all") in the magazine Nederland. His debut as a poet followed in 1943, with the collection of poems De moerbeitoppen ruischten ("The mulberries rustled"). He was cofounder of the magazine Podium (1943–1944). In 1947, he became editor of Dietsche Warande en Belfort. He wrote many poems for special occasions and meetings, such as for the yearly pilgrimages to the IJzertoren, and screenplays for television. His poetry is characterised by the usage of a traditional poetic form and a clear language, combined with a romantic style.

Anton van Wilderode died in Sint-Niklaas on 15 June 1998.

== Writings ==
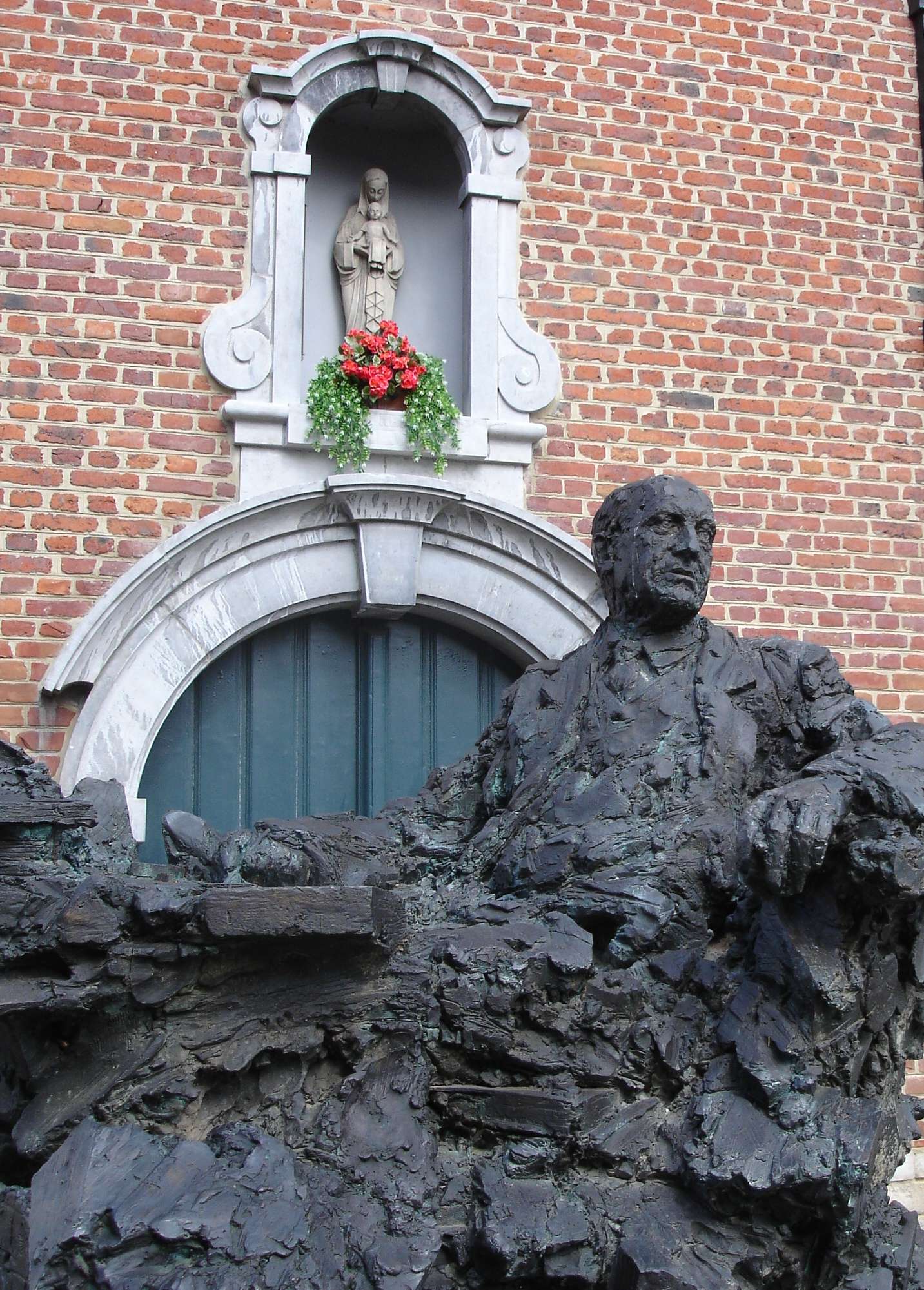
Statue of Anton van Wilderode in Sint-Niklaas, Belgium

- Dis al (1939)
- De moerbeitoppen ruisten (1943)
- Herinnering en gezang (1946)
- Najaar van Hellas (1947)
- Het land der mensen (1952)
- Het herdertje van Pest (1957)
- Bloemlezing (1958)
- De antikwaar: opera for television (1959)
- Filip De Pillecyn (1960)
- Vergilius' Aeneis 1-6 (1962)
- De dag van Eden (1964)
- André Demedts (1965)
- Sint-Niklaas en het Land van Waas (1967)
- Maria moeder (1967)
- De dubbelfluit (1968)
- Dier-bare poëzie: gedichten over dieren (1971)
- Het groot jaargetijdenboek (1971)
- Vergilius' Bucolica (1971)
- Vergilius' Aeneis 7-12 (1971)
- Verzamelde gedichten 1943-1973 (Collected poems, 1974)
- Vergilius' Georgica (1975)
- Gedichten (1976)
- Dorp zonder ouders (1978)
- Albert Van Dyck (1978)
- Vergilius' Bucolica, Georgica, Aeneis (1978)
- Circus (1979)
- Verzamelde gedichten (1980)
- Gustaaf Van Loon (1980)
- Gies Cosyns (1981)
- Jan De Smedt (1981)
- En het woord was bij God: 500 religieuze gedichten uit de Nederlandse letterkunde (1981)
- De overoever (1981)
- Luisteren naar fluisteren (1981)
- Moerbeke-Waas toen en thans (1982)
- Het land van amen (1983)
- Daar is maar één land dat mijn land kan zijn (1983)
- Zingend brons (1983)
- Een tent van tamarinde (1985)
- De vlinderboom (1985)
- De dag begint bij een puin: IJzerbedevaarten in verzen (1985)
- Dienstbaar het woord (1985)
- Herman Jacobs, kunstschilder (1986)
- En het dorp zal duren (1986)
- Het tweede jaargetijdenboek (1987)
- Op hoop van vrede (1988)
- Zachtjes, mijn zoon ligt hier (1988)
- Liederen uit mijn landhuis: 50 gedichten van Horatius (1988)
- Het hart op de tong: romantische verhalen uit de 19de eeuw (1990)
- Het sierlijke bestaan der steden (1990)
- De zeven slapers (1991)
- Poedersneeuw (1991)
- Apostel na de twaalf (1991)
- Brugge Brugge (1992)
- Een plek voor louter klaarte (1993)
- In al begonnen Vrede (1993)
- Ex libris (1994)
- De aarde van mijn geheugen: Europees huldeboek (1994)
- Cortewalle (1994)
- Het zonnelied of het loflied der schepselen (1995)
- Het oudste geluk (1995)
- Barmhartig hout: 30 middeleeuwse misericordes (1996)
- Buitengaats (1996)
- Tweegelui (1997)
- Hout op snee (1997)
- Het beeld van de dichter (1998)
- De dag sneeuwt dicht: herfst- en wintergedichten (1998)
- Jan Hoogsteyns (1998)
- Reizend naar het licht: de mooiste religieuze poëzie (1999)
- Volledig dichtwerk (1999)

== See also ==
- Flemish literature
- Flemish movement
