= The Conversion of Saint Bavo =

Altarpiece by Peter Paul Rubens

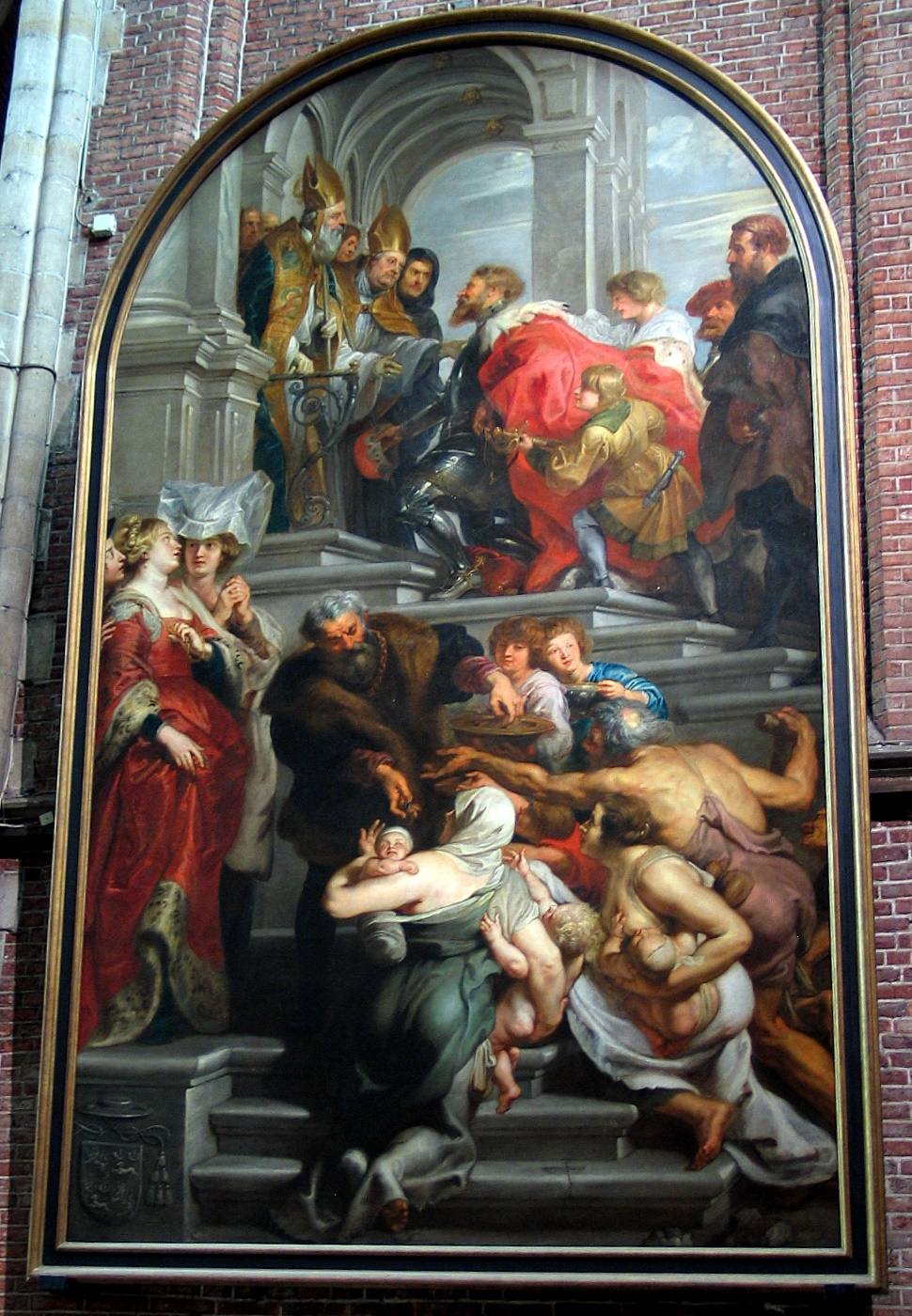
The Conversion of Saint Bavo (1623-1624) by Rubens

The Conversion of Saint Bavo is an altarpiece by Peter Paul Rubens, dated 1623–1624. It was commissioned as the high altarpiece for Sint-Baafskathedraal in Ghent by bishop Antoon Triest (1577–1657). It is still sited in the cathedral. An oil sketch for it is now in the National Gallery, London.

== Bibliography ==
- Hans Vlieghe, Saints (Corpus Rubenianum Ludwig Burchard, 8), nr. 72, Arcade, Brussel, 1972
- Gent, duizend jaar kunst en cultuur, Bijlokemuseum, Gent, 1975
