= Saint Bavo's Cathedral, Ghent =

Saint Bavo's Cathedral
- Sint Baafskathedraal (Dutch)
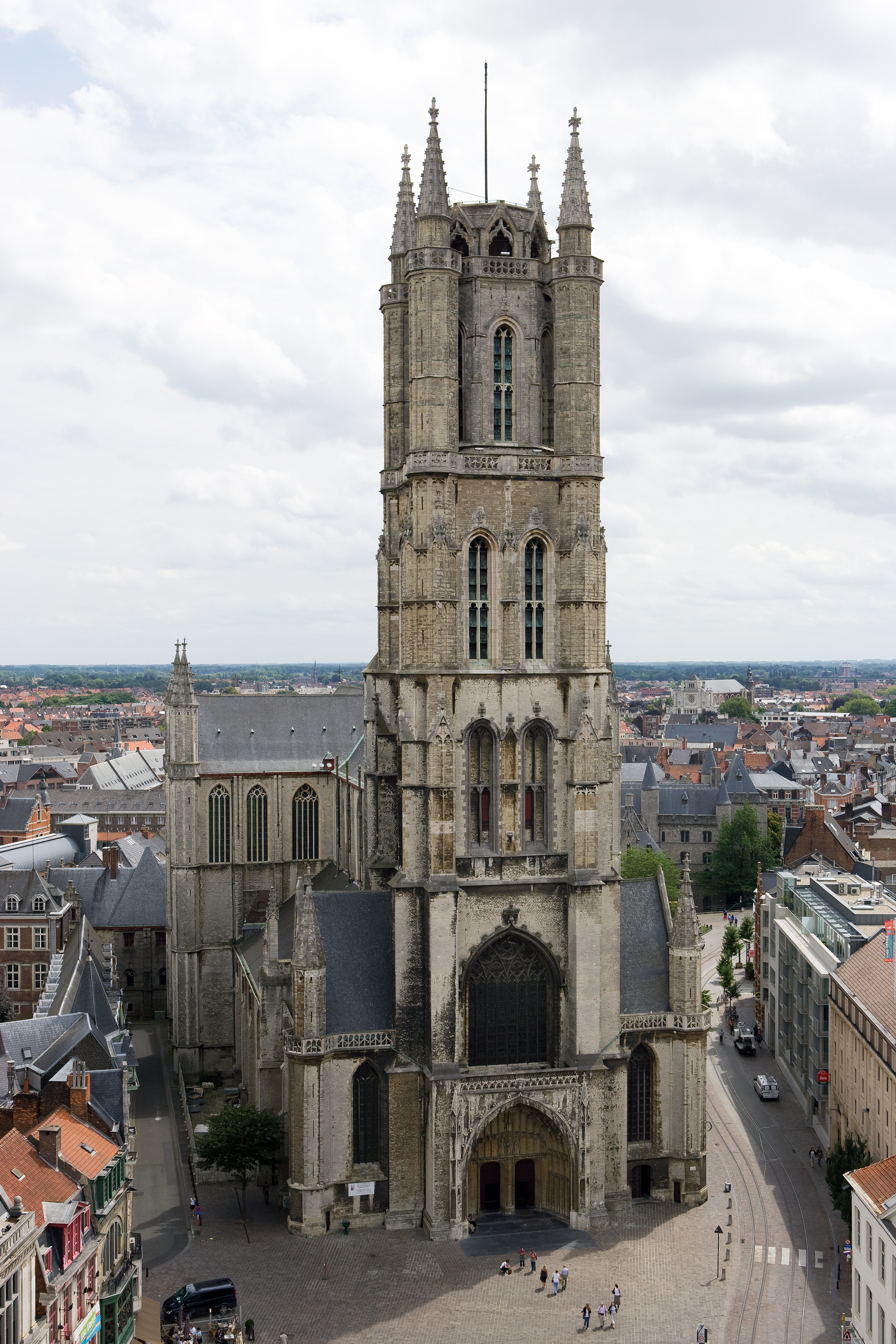
- West façade
- Saint Bavo's Cathedral
- 51.0530°N 3.727°E
- Location: Ghent
- Country: Belgium
- Denomination: Roman Catholic
- Website: sintbaafskathedraal.be

Architecture
- Style: Gothic
- Years built: 13th–16th centuries
- Groundbreaking: c. 1274

Administration
- Diocese: Ghent
- Parish: Saint John the Baptist

Clergy
- Bishop: Lode Van Hecke

Saint Bavo's Cathedral, also known as Sint-Baafs Cathedral (Dutch: Sint Baafskathedraal), is a Roman Catholic cathedral in Ghent, Belgium. The 89-metre-tall (292 ft) Gothic building is the seat of the Diocese of Ghent and is named for Saint Bavo of Ghent. It contains the well-known Ghent Altarpiece, also called the Adoration of the Mystic Lamb.

== History ==
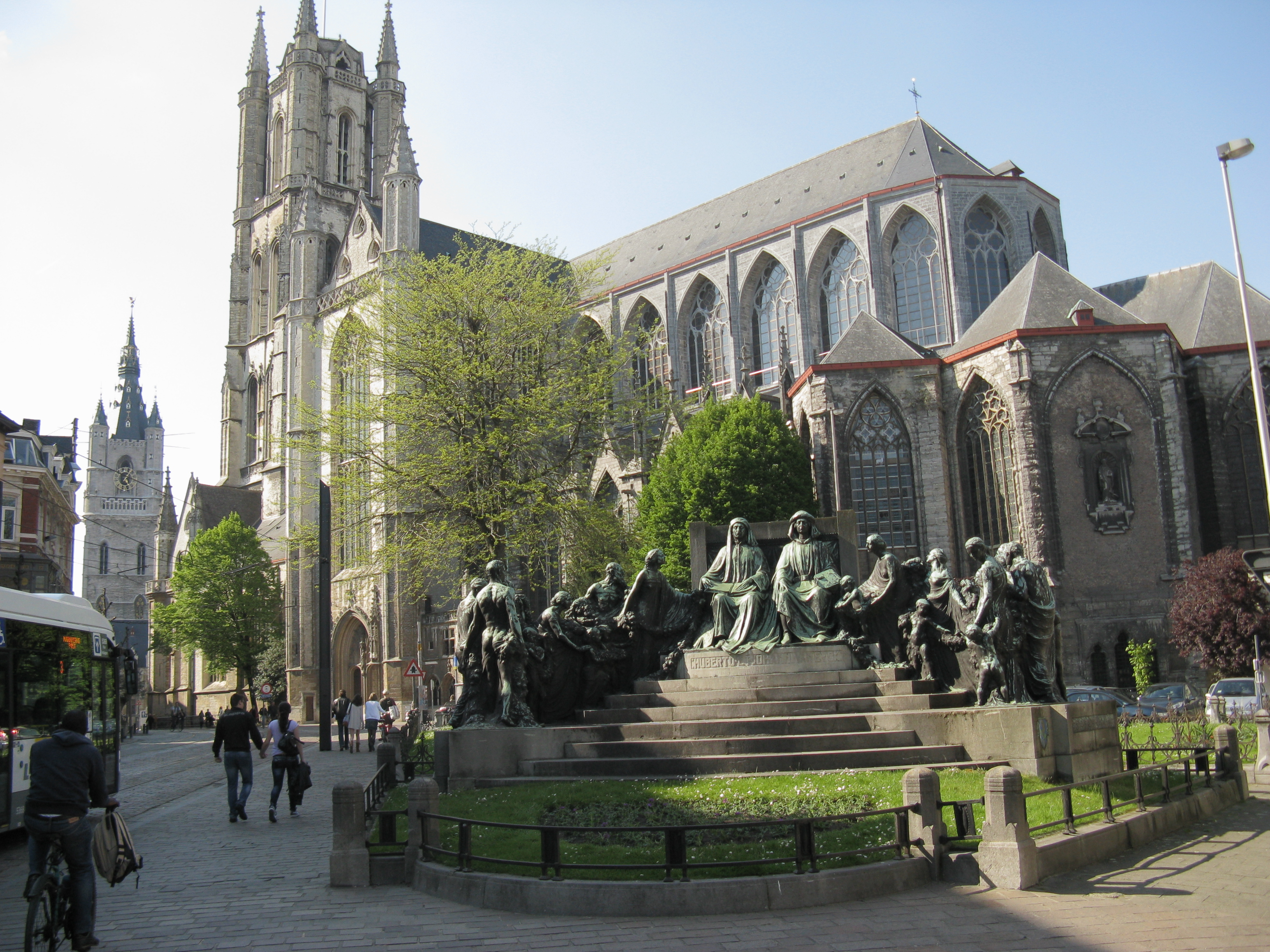
Cathedral from the Maaseikplein

The cathedral stands on the site of the former Chapel of St. John the Baptist, which was primarily of wooden construction and was consecrated in 942 by Transmarus, Bishop of Tournai and Noyon. Traces of a later Romanesque structure can be found in the cathedral's crypt. Construction of the Gothic church began around 1274.

In the subsequent period from the 14th through 16th centuries, nearly continuous expansion projects in the Gothic style were executed on the structure. A new choir, radiating chapels, expansions of the transepts, a chapter house, nave aisles and a single-tower western section were all added.

In 1539, as a result of the rebellion against Charles V, who was baptized in the church, the old Abbey of St. Bavo was dissolved. Its abbot and monks went on to become canons in a chapter that was attached to what then became the Church of St. Bavo. When the Diocese of Ghent was founded in 1559, the church became its cathedral. Construction was considered complete on 7 June 1569.

In the summer of 1566, bands of Calvinist iconoclasts visited Catholic churches in the Netherlands, including St. Bavo, shattering stained-glass windows, smashing statues, and destroying paintings and other artworks they perceived as idolatrous. However, the altarpiece by the Van Eycks was saved.

== Interior ==
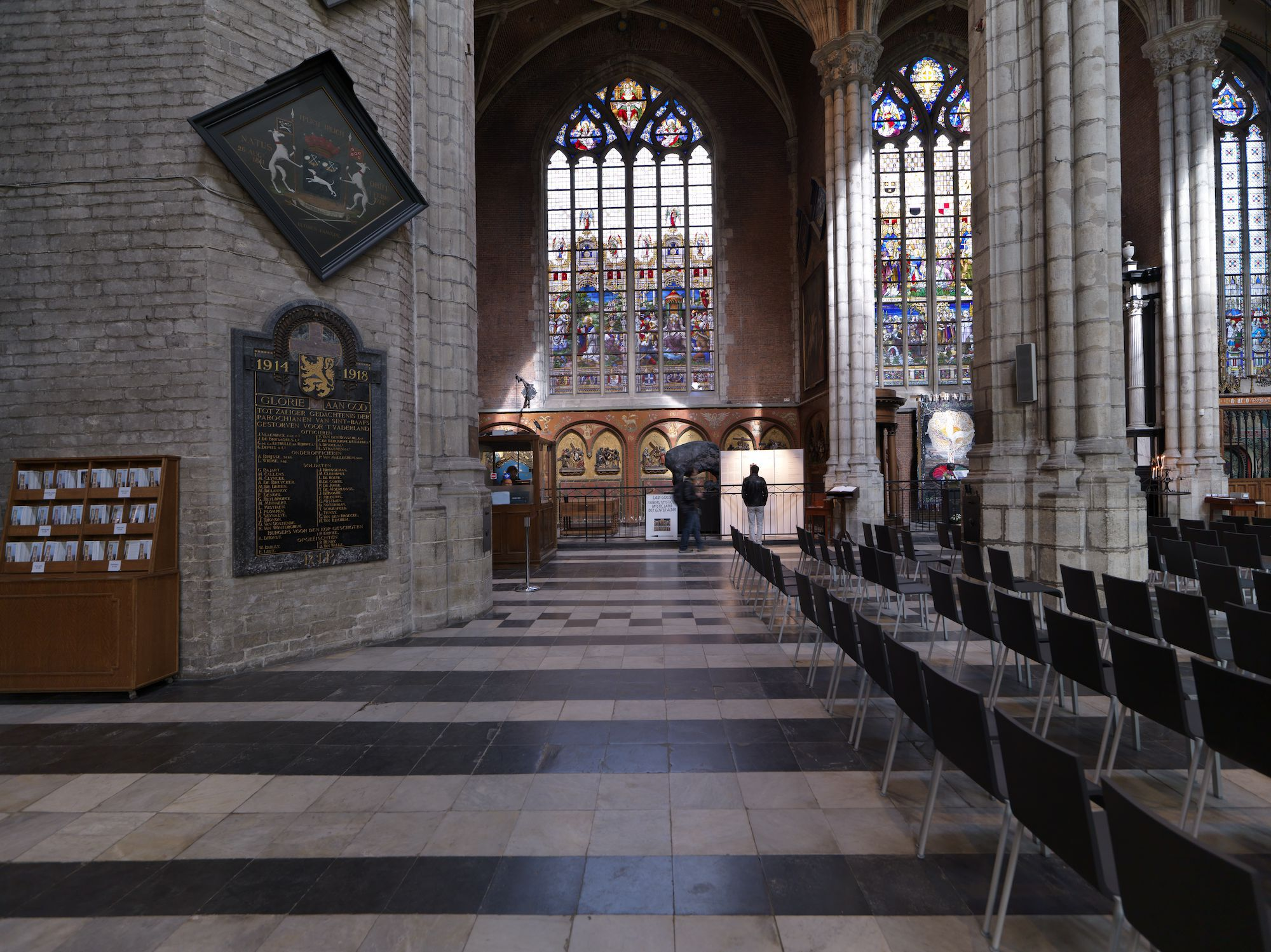
Interior

=== Choir ===
The most impressive part is the high choir with stalls for the members of the Chapter of Saint-Bavon. The episcopal throne is located on the right side with the episcopal arms visible. Highlights of the interior decoration of the choir include the Baroque high altar (1702–1782), in white, black, and red flamed marble, and the tomb monuments of Ghent bishops, including that of Antonius Triest, in white and black marble (1652–1654), a major work of Jérôme Duquesnoy the Younger. On the right side is the gallery with painted crests of the members of the Order of the Golden Fleece.

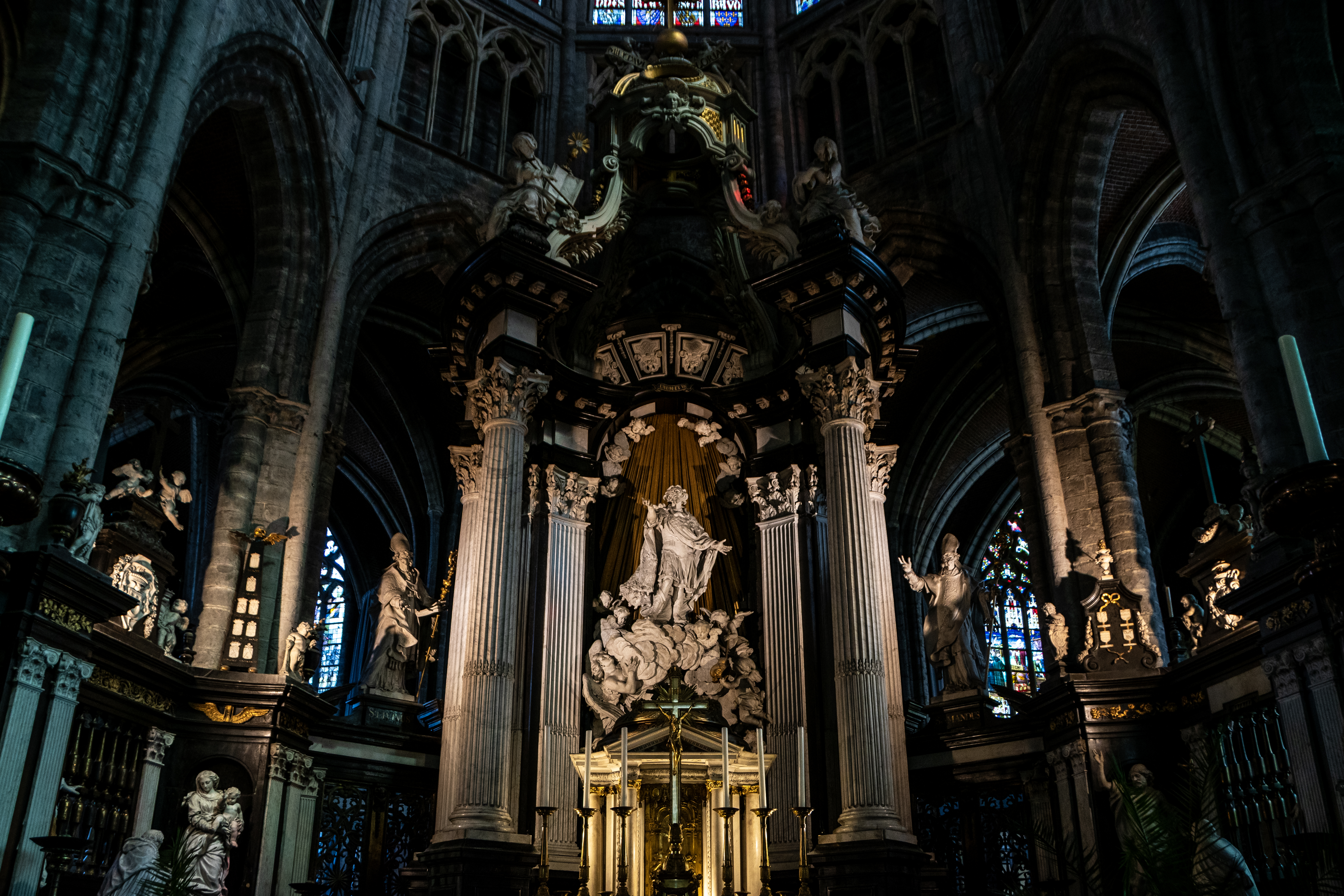
Baroque high altar

In the choir is the 1559 painting The Queen of Sheba visits King Solomon by the Flemish artist Lucas de Heere. This allegorical work depicts King Solomon as Philip II of Spain, recognizable by his facial features, receiving gifts from the Queen of Sheba, an allegory of the Low Countries, representing that country donating its riches to the Spanish king in thanks for his prudent government.

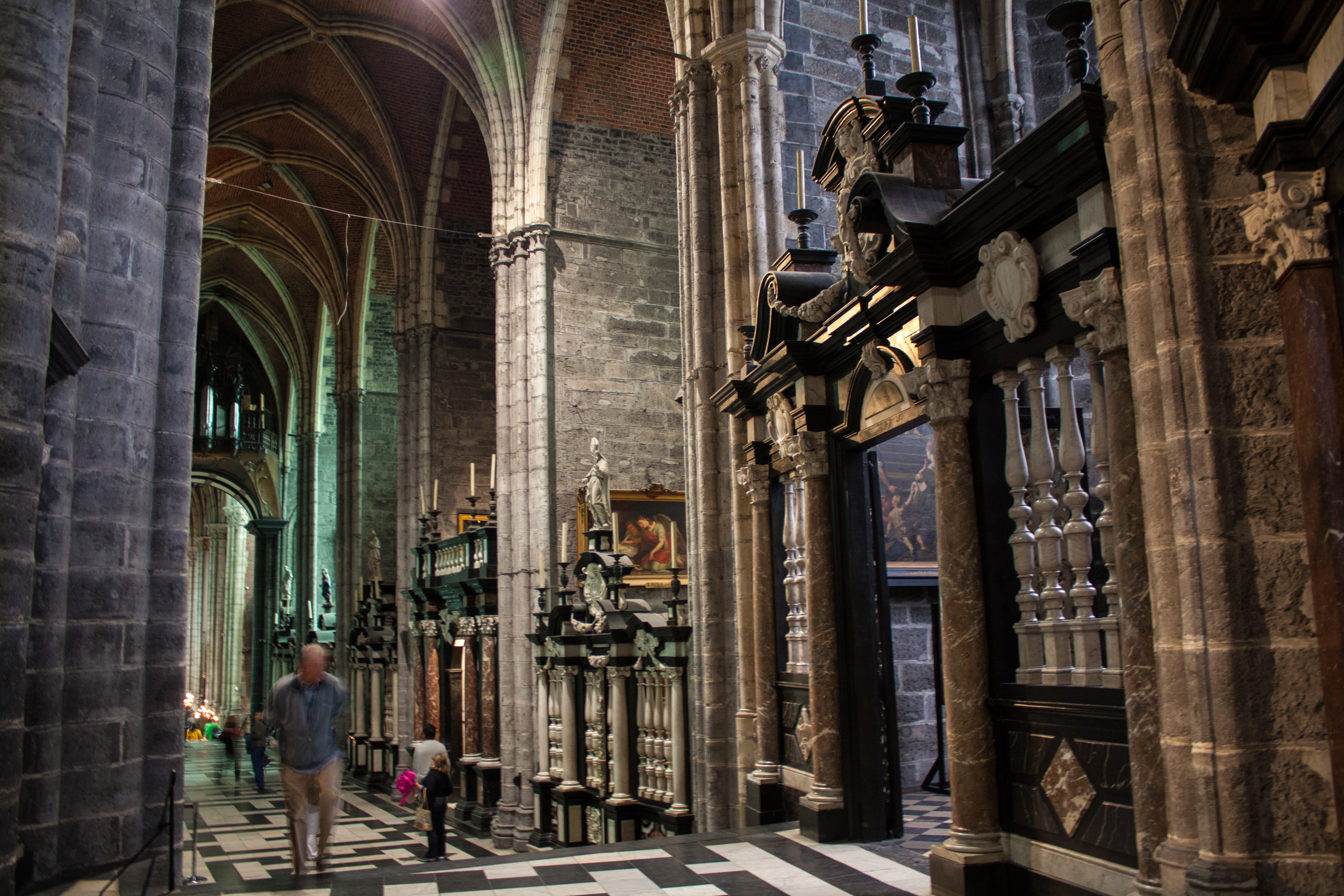
Elaborate stone and marble naves inside the upper church

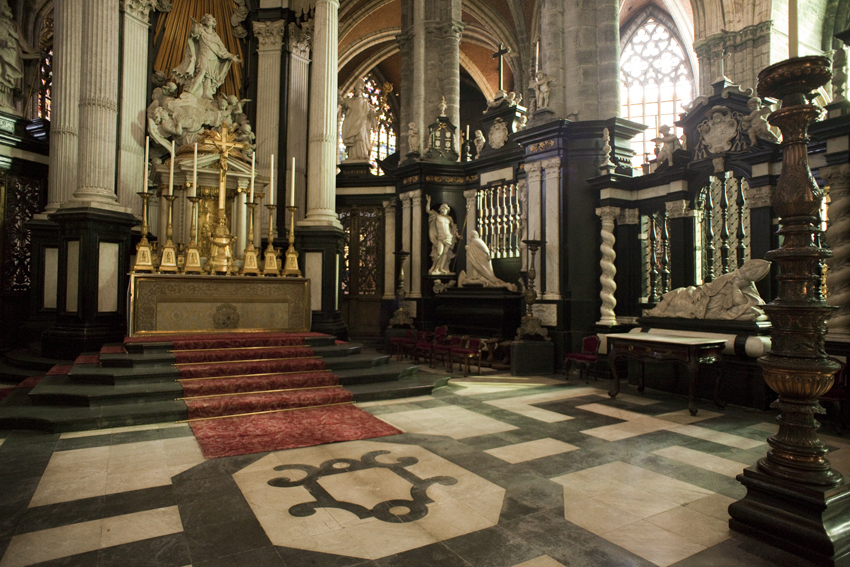
High choir of the cathedral, in the upper church

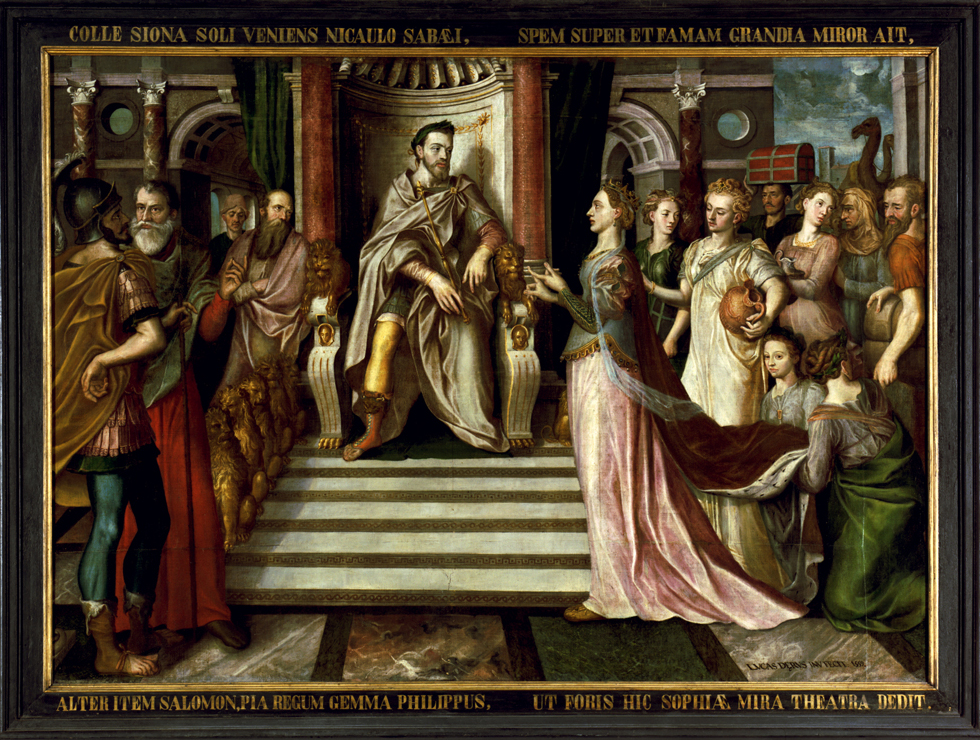
The Queen of Sheba visits King Solomon by Lucas de Heere

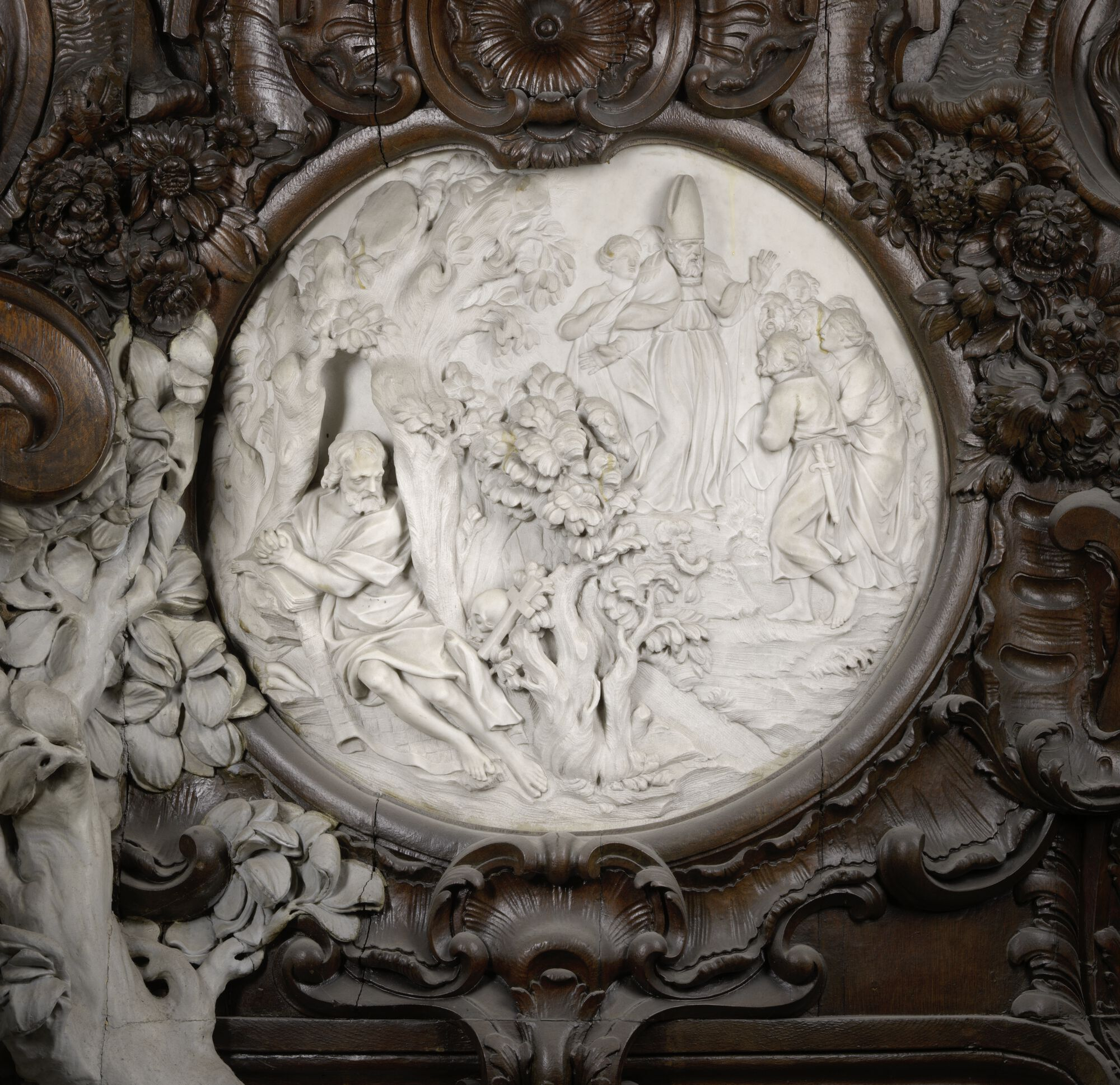
Bavo medaillon

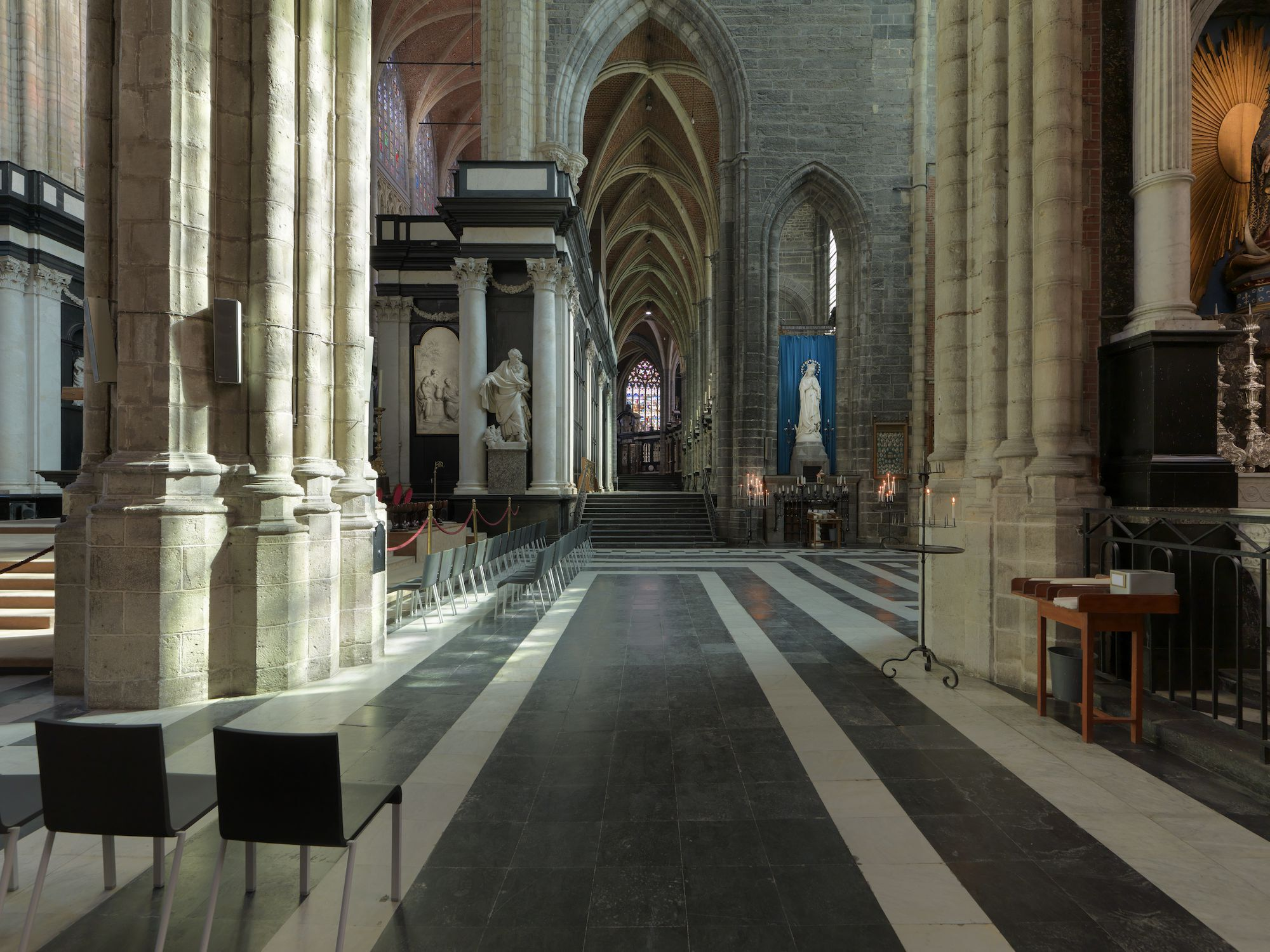
View of the northern aisle

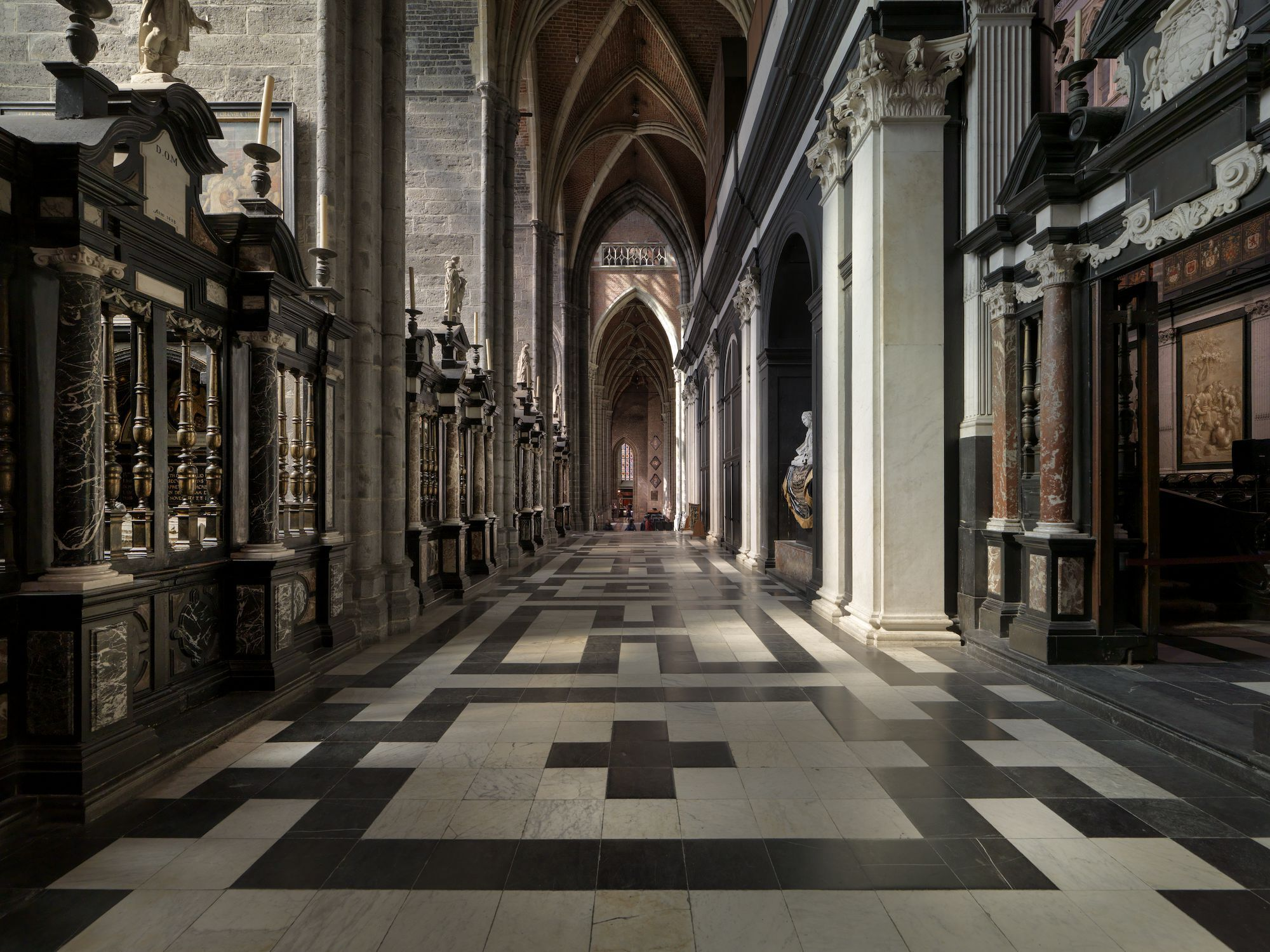
Ambulatory

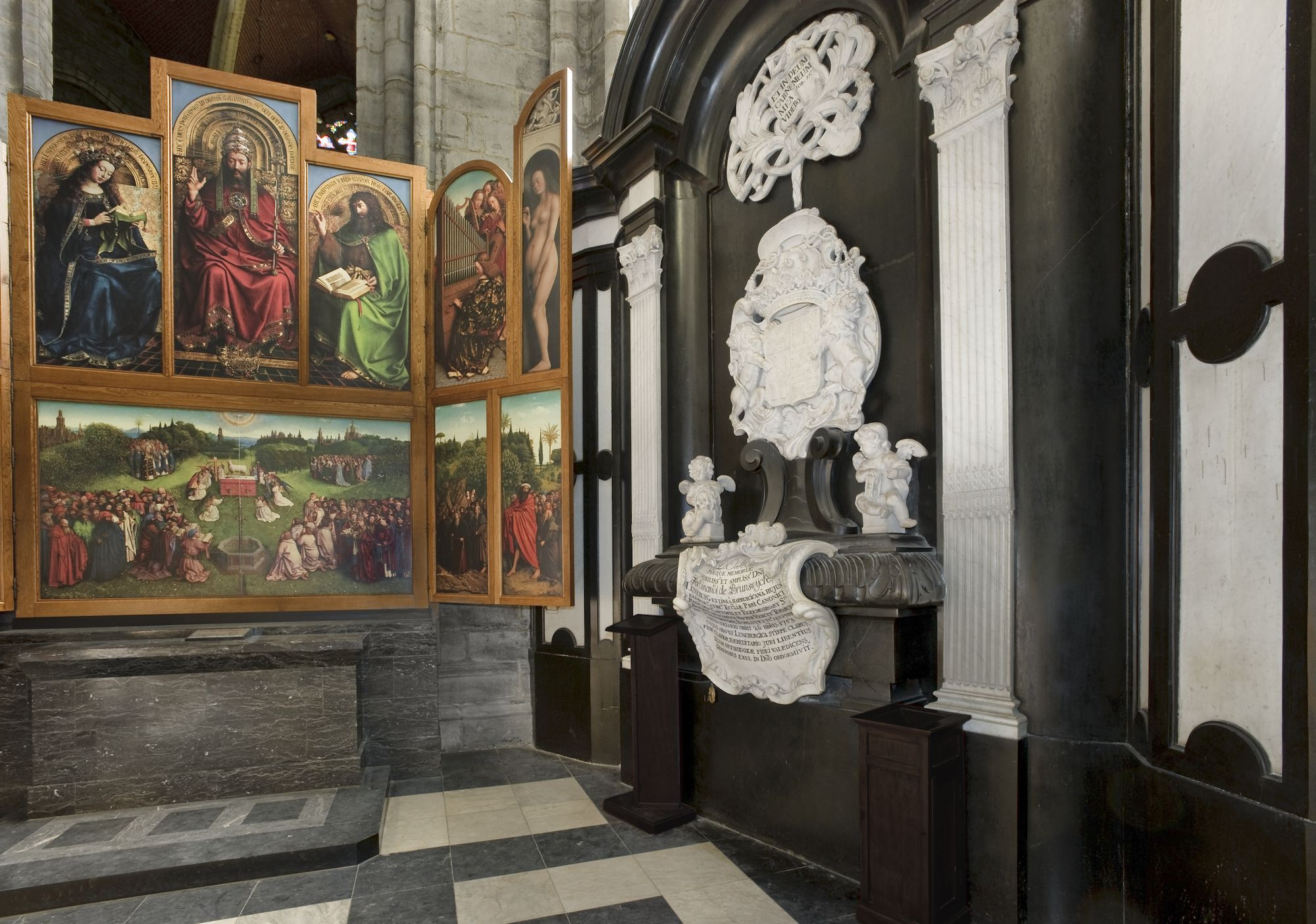
Epitaph of Ferdinand De Brunswyck-Luneburg

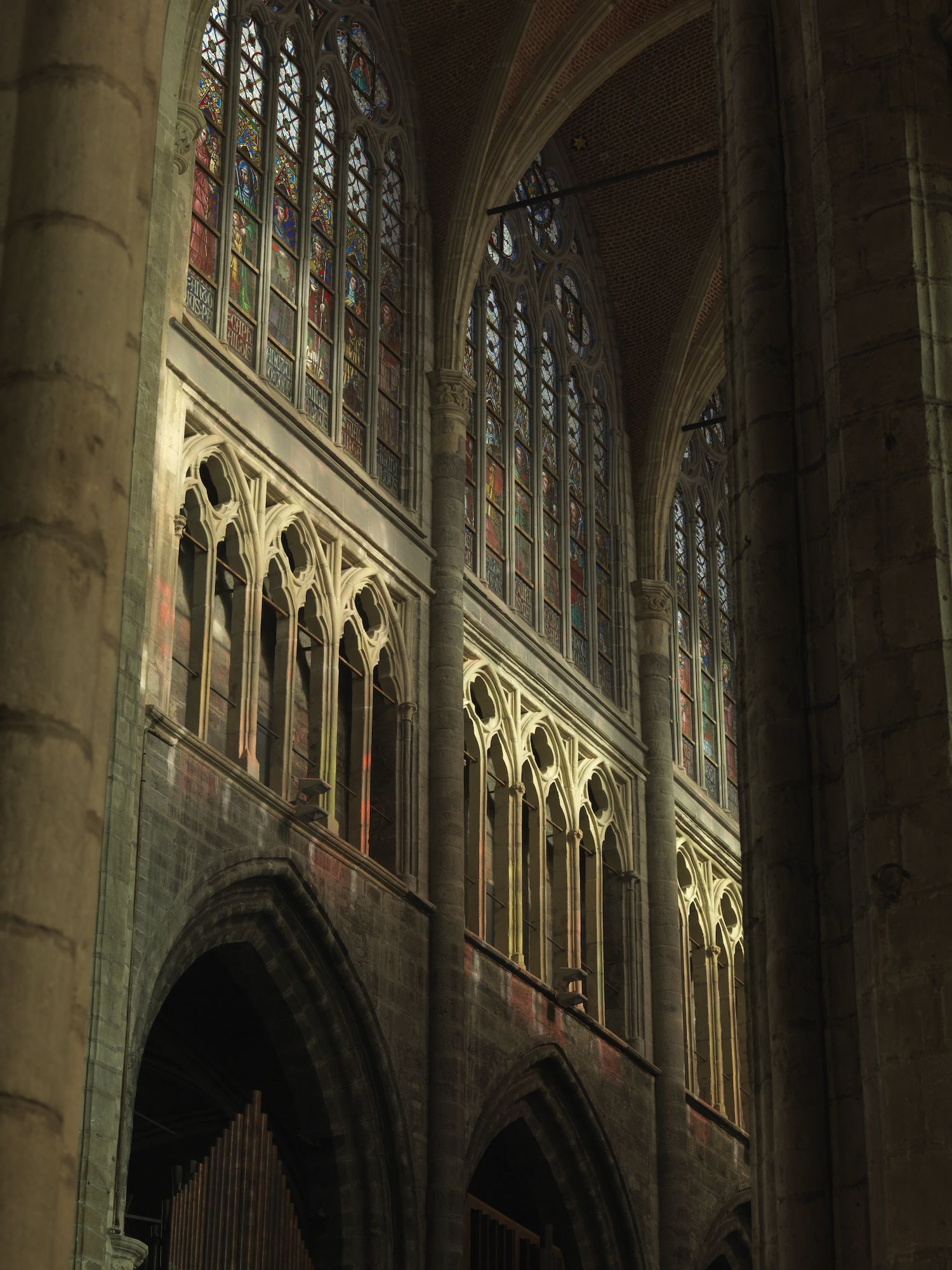
Interior (stained glass windows)

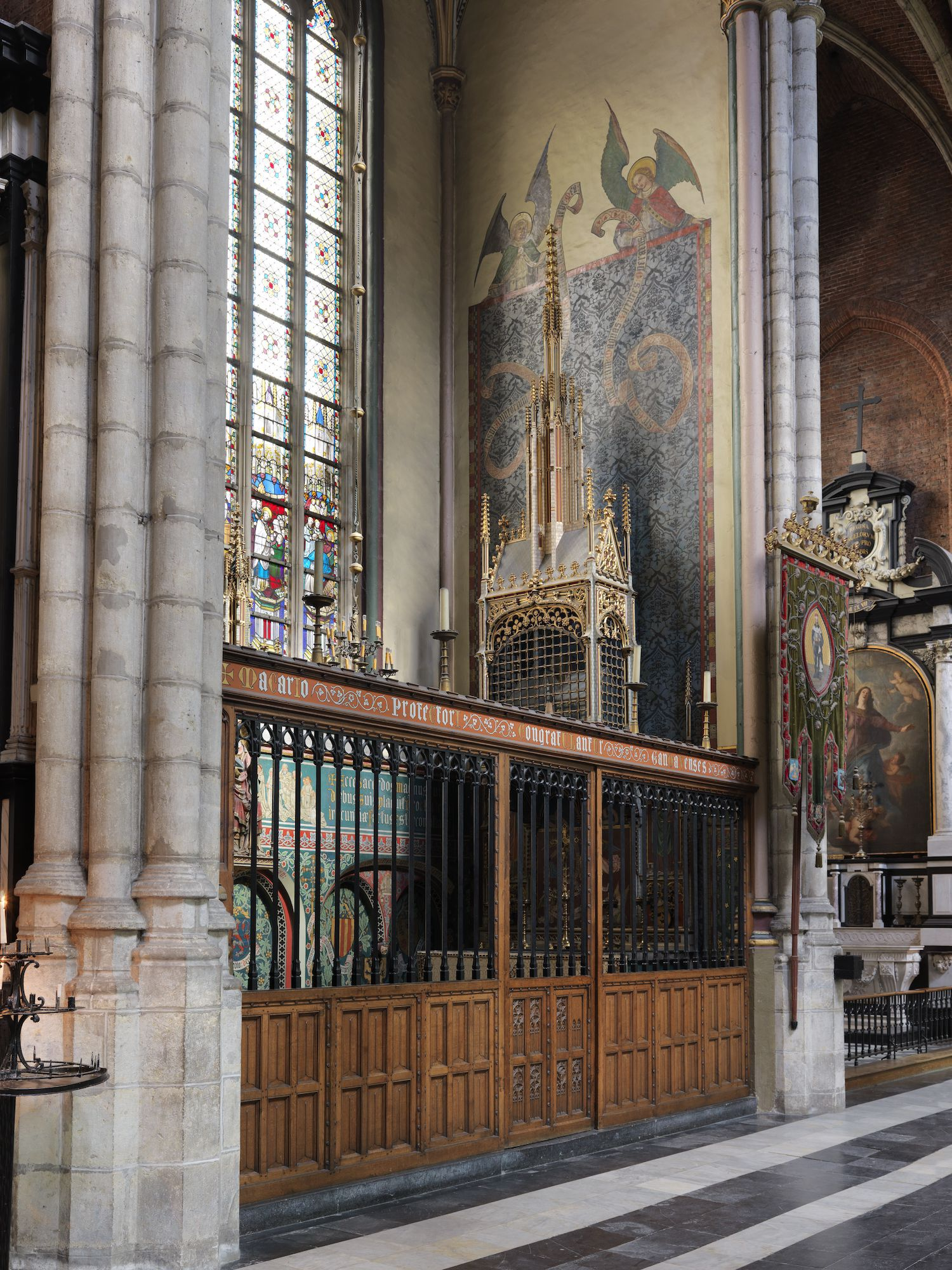
Chapel of Saint Macharius

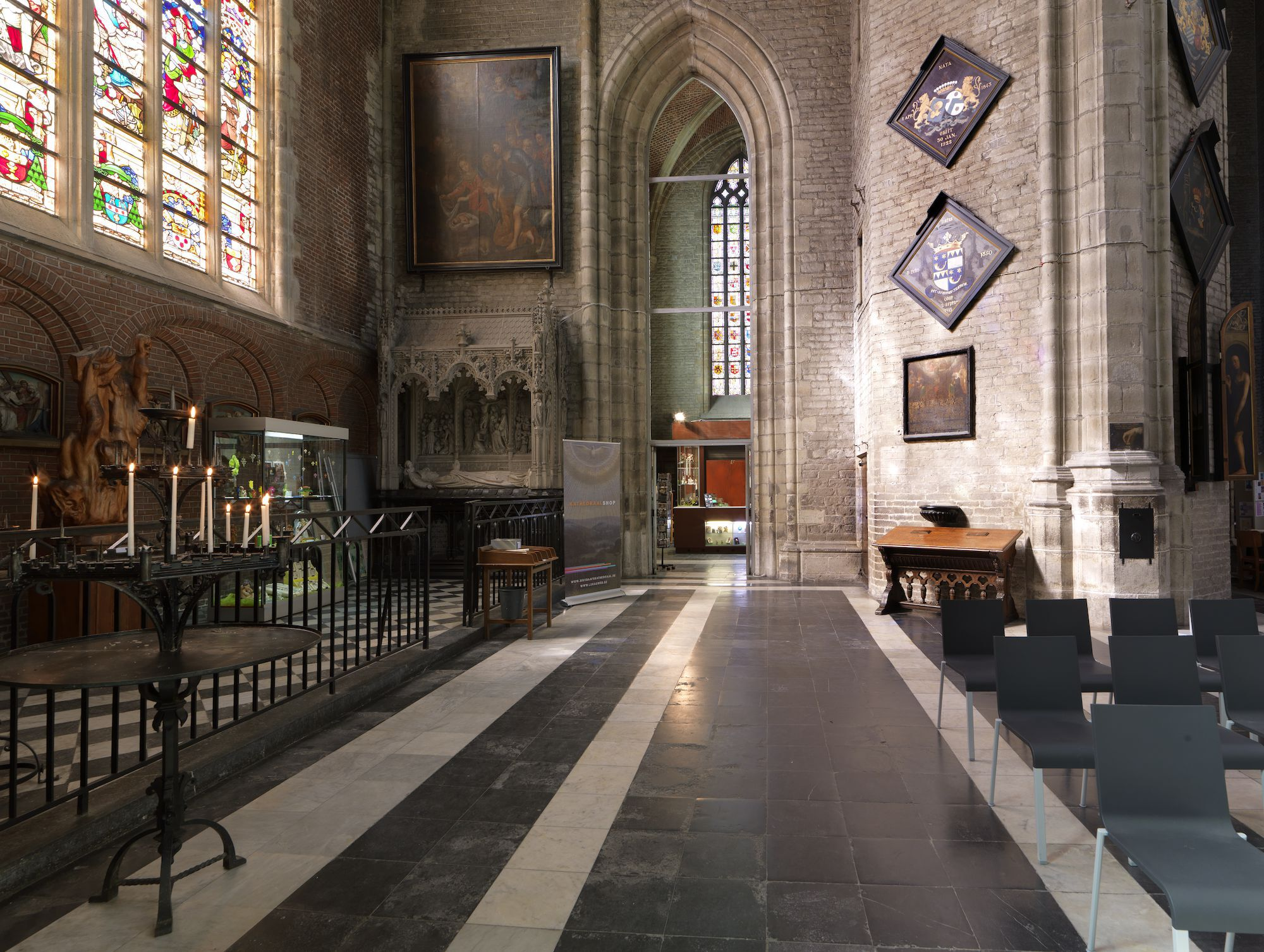
Chapel of the Holy Spirit

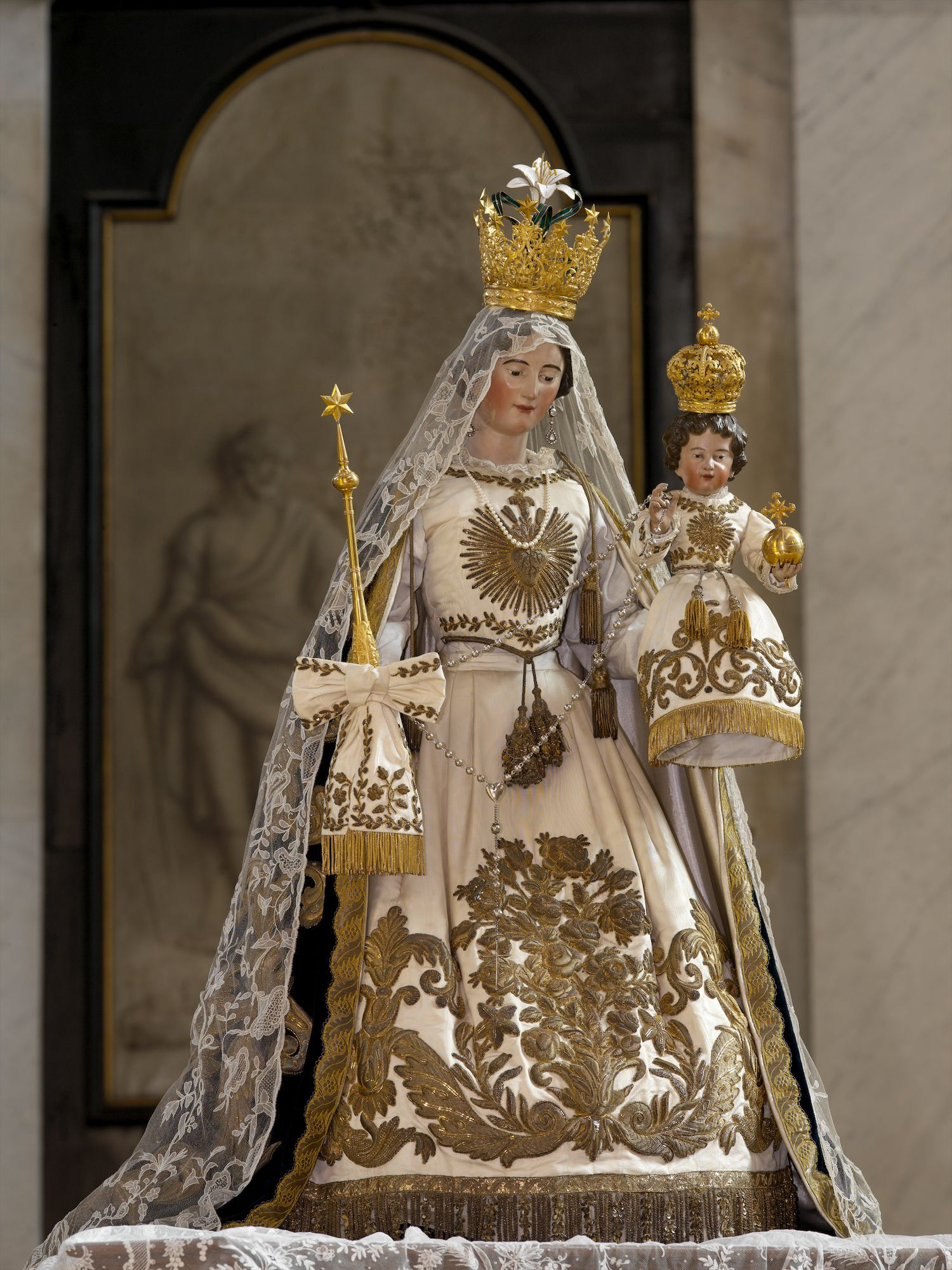
Our Lady of Radiën

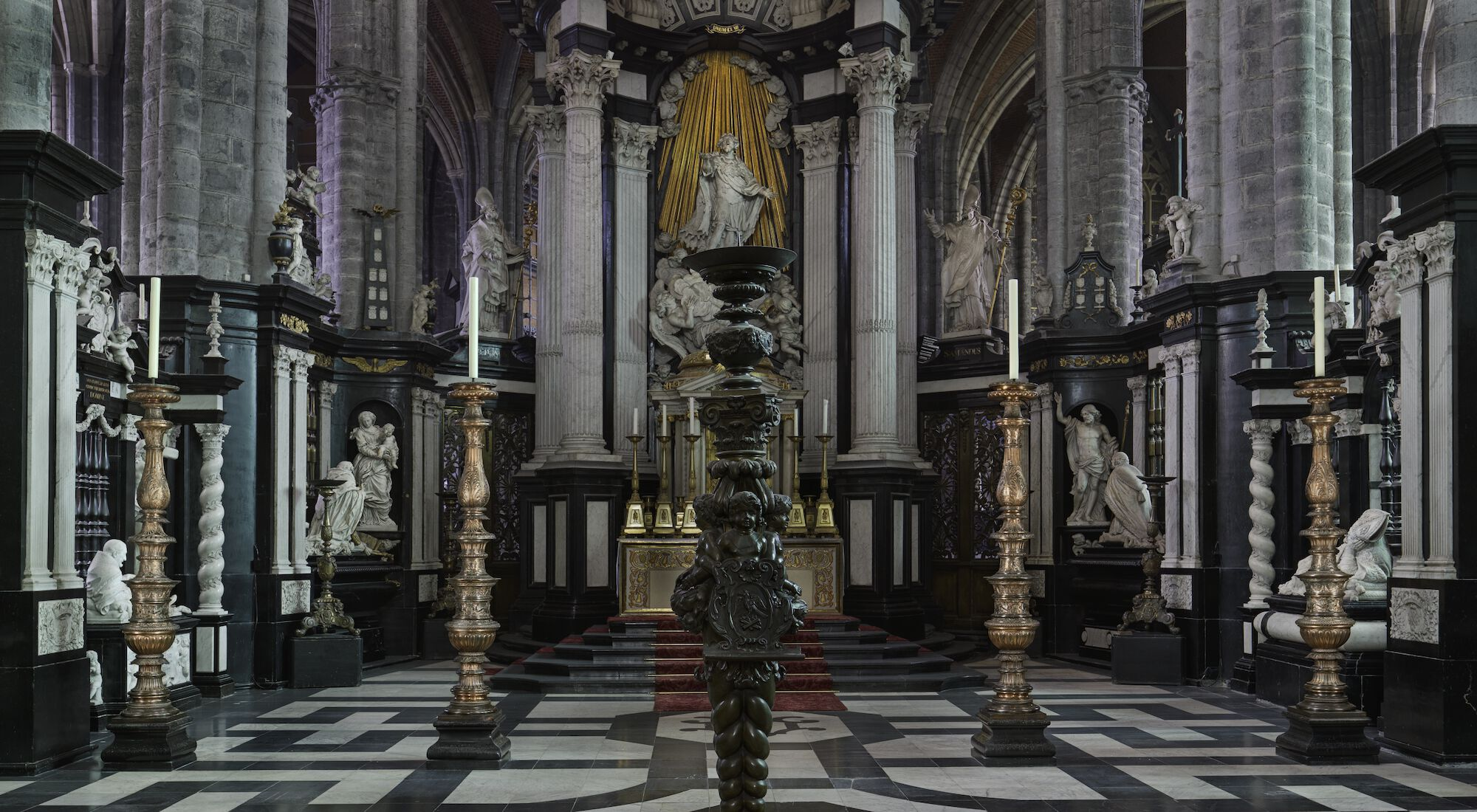
Four identical candlesticks by Benedetto da Rovezzano

=== Nave ===
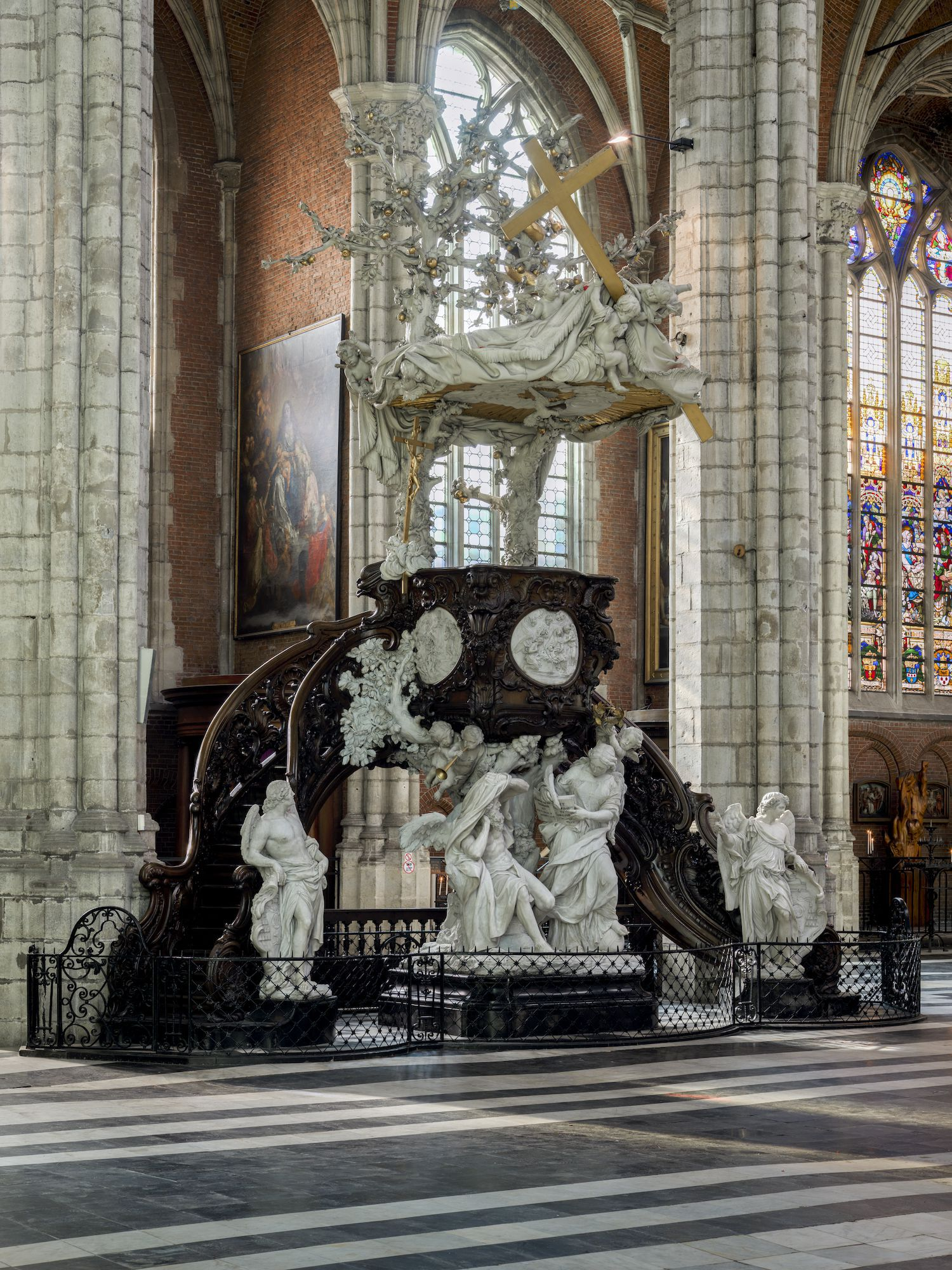
Pulpit by Laurent Delvaux

In the nave there is an impressive Rococo pulpit (1741–1745), made in oak, gilded wood and white and black marble by Laurent Delvaux, with wrought-iron railings by J. Arens. There are also chairs designed by the contemporary designer Maarten Van Severen. The main altar is placed between the nave and the choir.

=== Treasury and crypt ===
In the Chapel of the Holiest, an important Calvary Triptych is on display. This 15th-century work is attributed to Justus van Gent. Finally, there is a valuable collection of important liturgical plates, reliquaries, and liturgical vessels dating from the 15th century onward. Among the important reliquaries are the head of Saint John the Baptist and of Saint Macarius. The important collection of hand-embroidered and brocaded liturgical ornaments is widely known as one of the most important of the country, some of which are put on display.

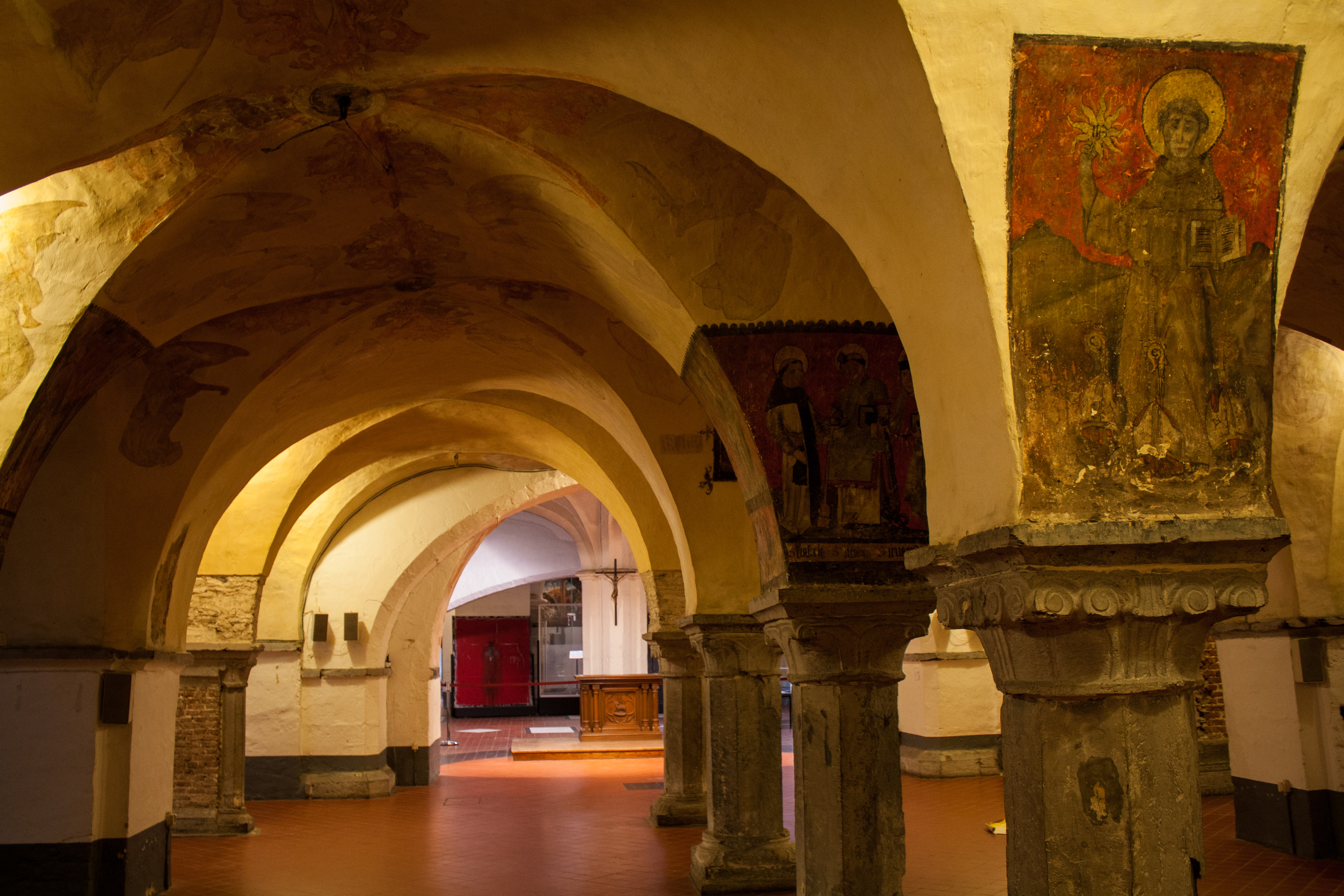
Interior of the Romanesque crypt, with frescos of religious figures visible

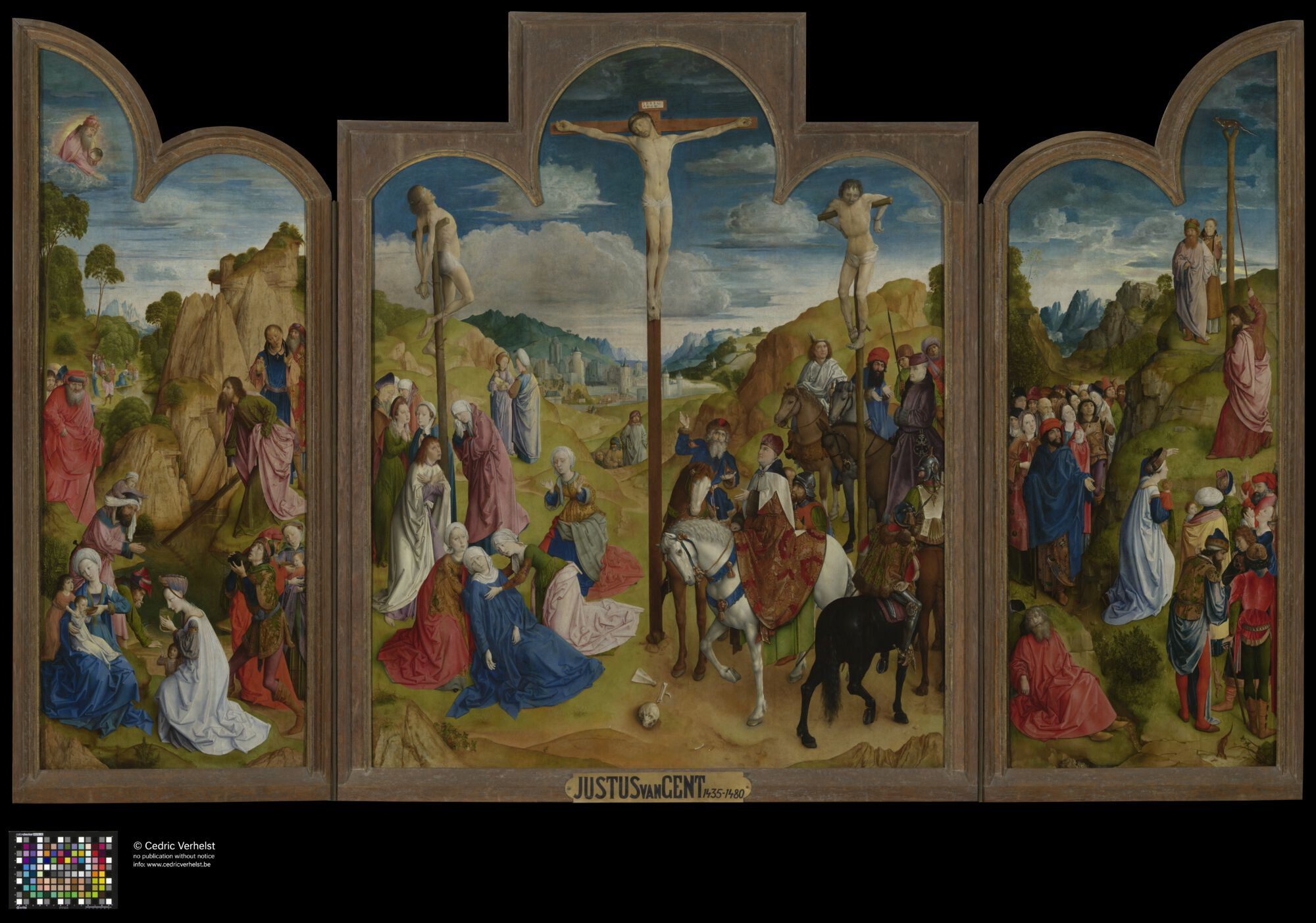
Calvary Triptych by Justus van Gent

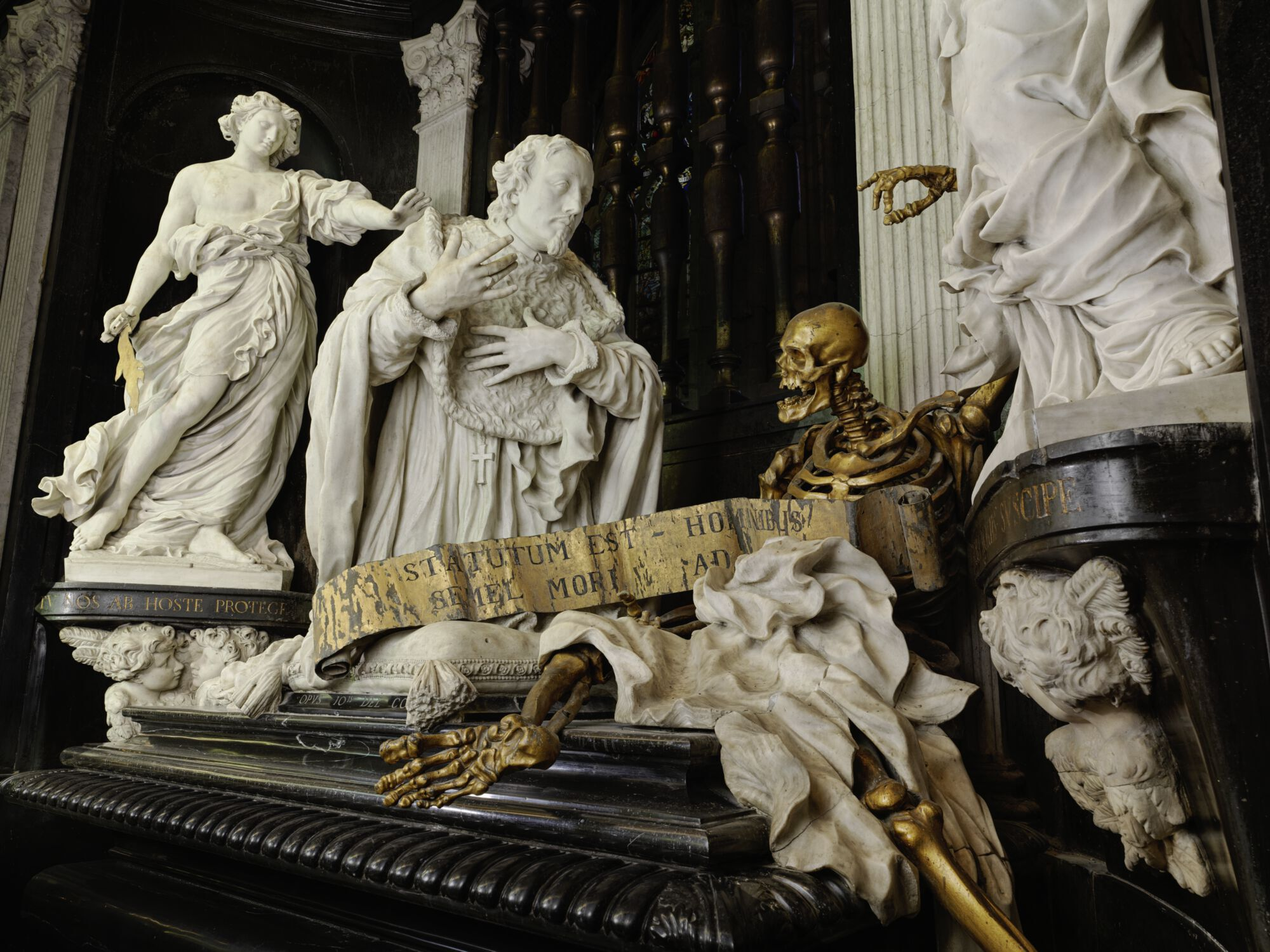
Tomb of Eugeen Albert d'Allamont

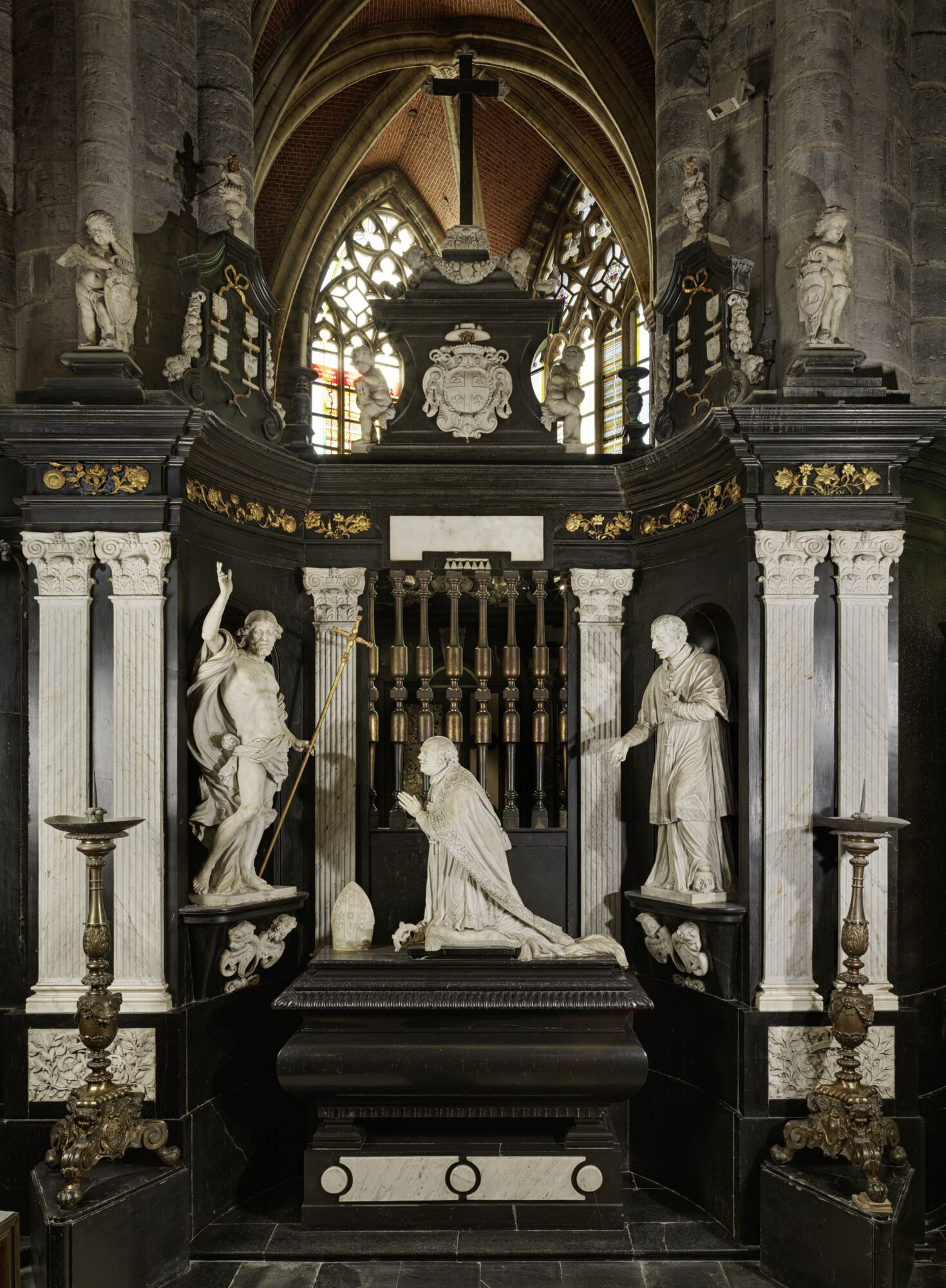
Tomb of Karel van den Bosch

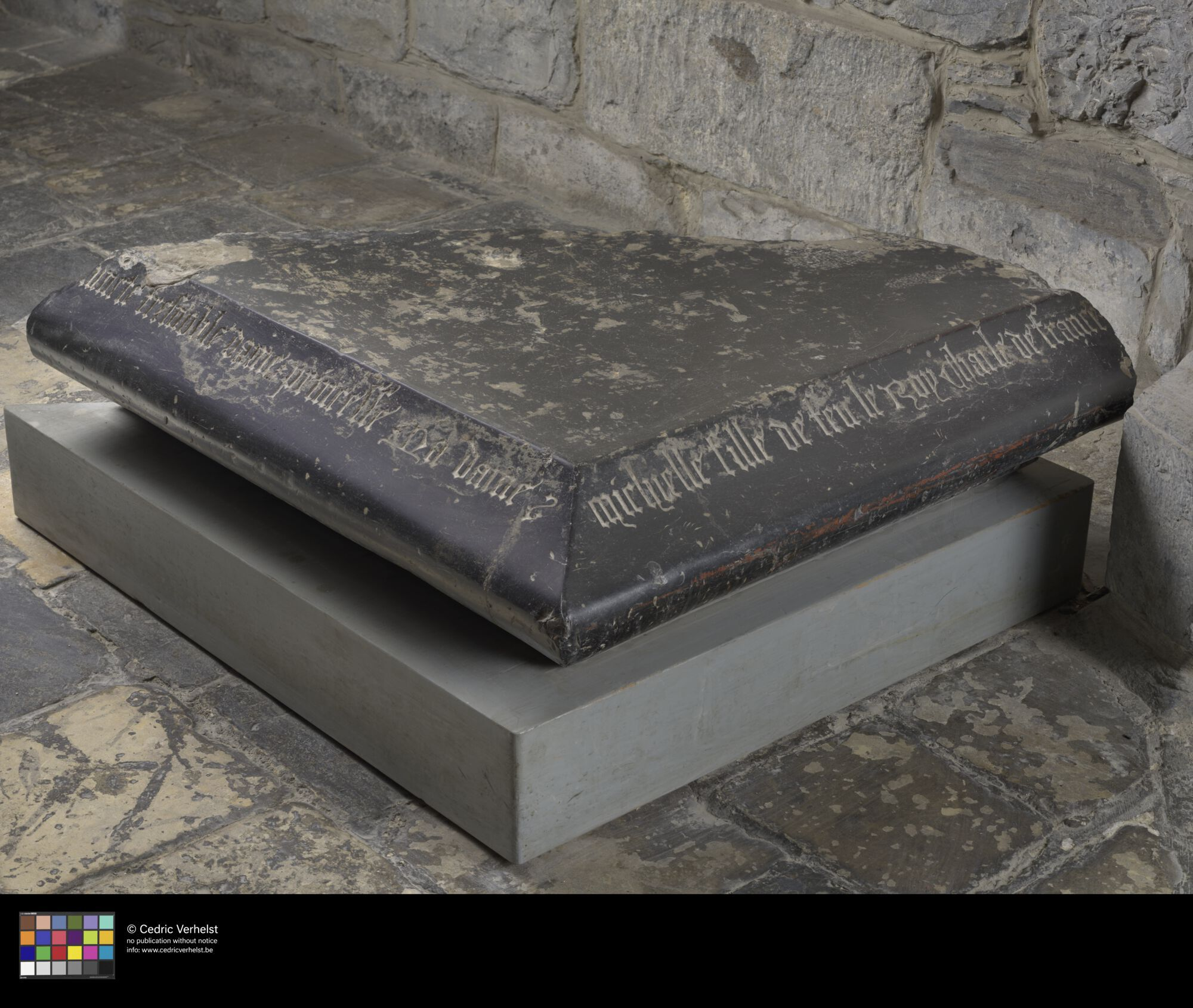
The remaining part of Michelle of Valois' tomb

== Organs ==
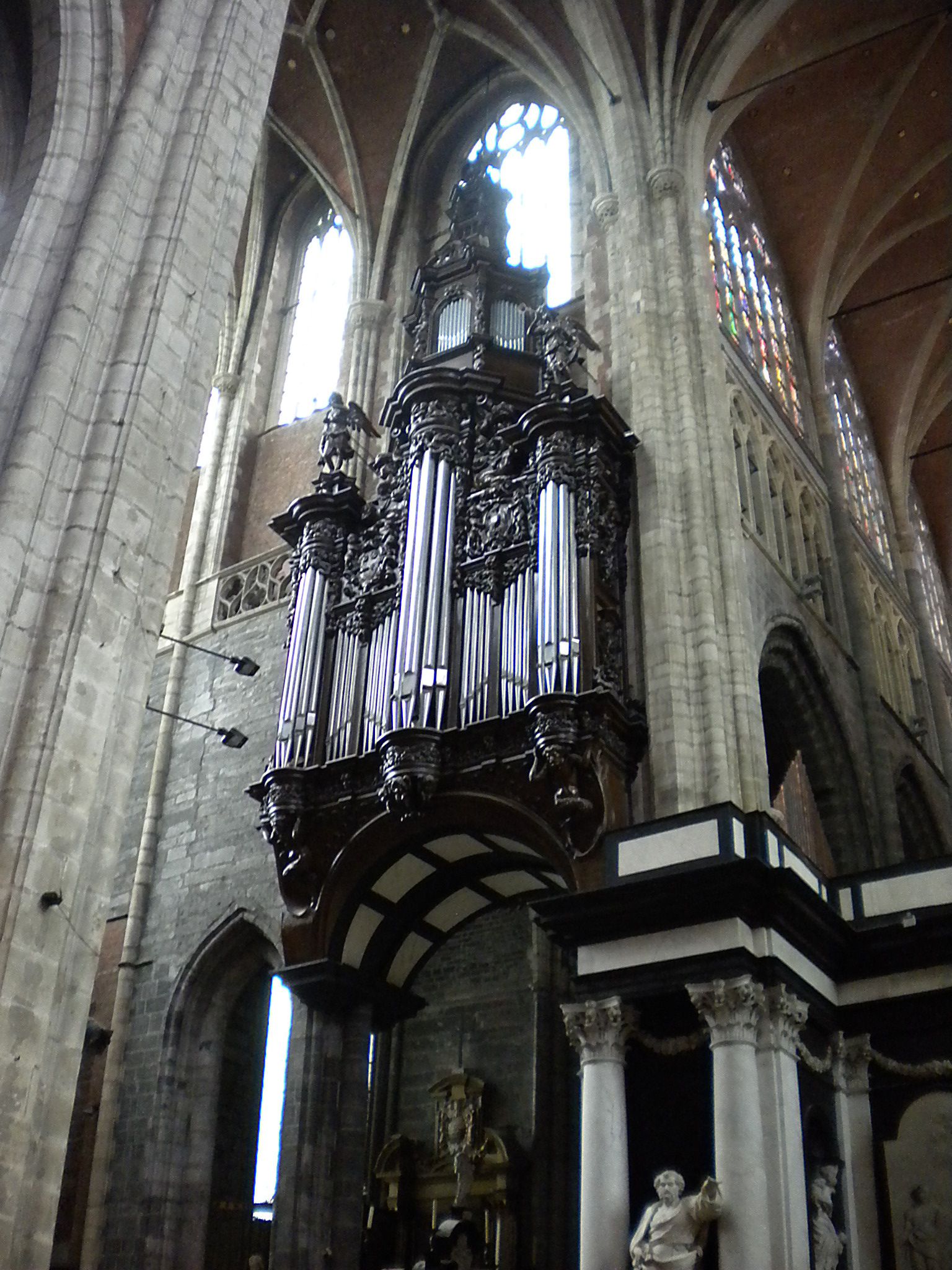
The great organ built in 1935 by Klais is the biggest of the Low Countries

The cathedral has four organs for use at liturgical celebrations. Most famous is the main organ in the upper church, the biggest organ in the Low Countries. In 1935, Mgr Coppieters commanded that the Klais organ from the world exhibition would be put inside the cathedral. The organ case dates from the 18th century and the complete organ has more than 6,000 pipes inside. It has five manuals.

== Art ==
=== Ghent Altarpiece ===
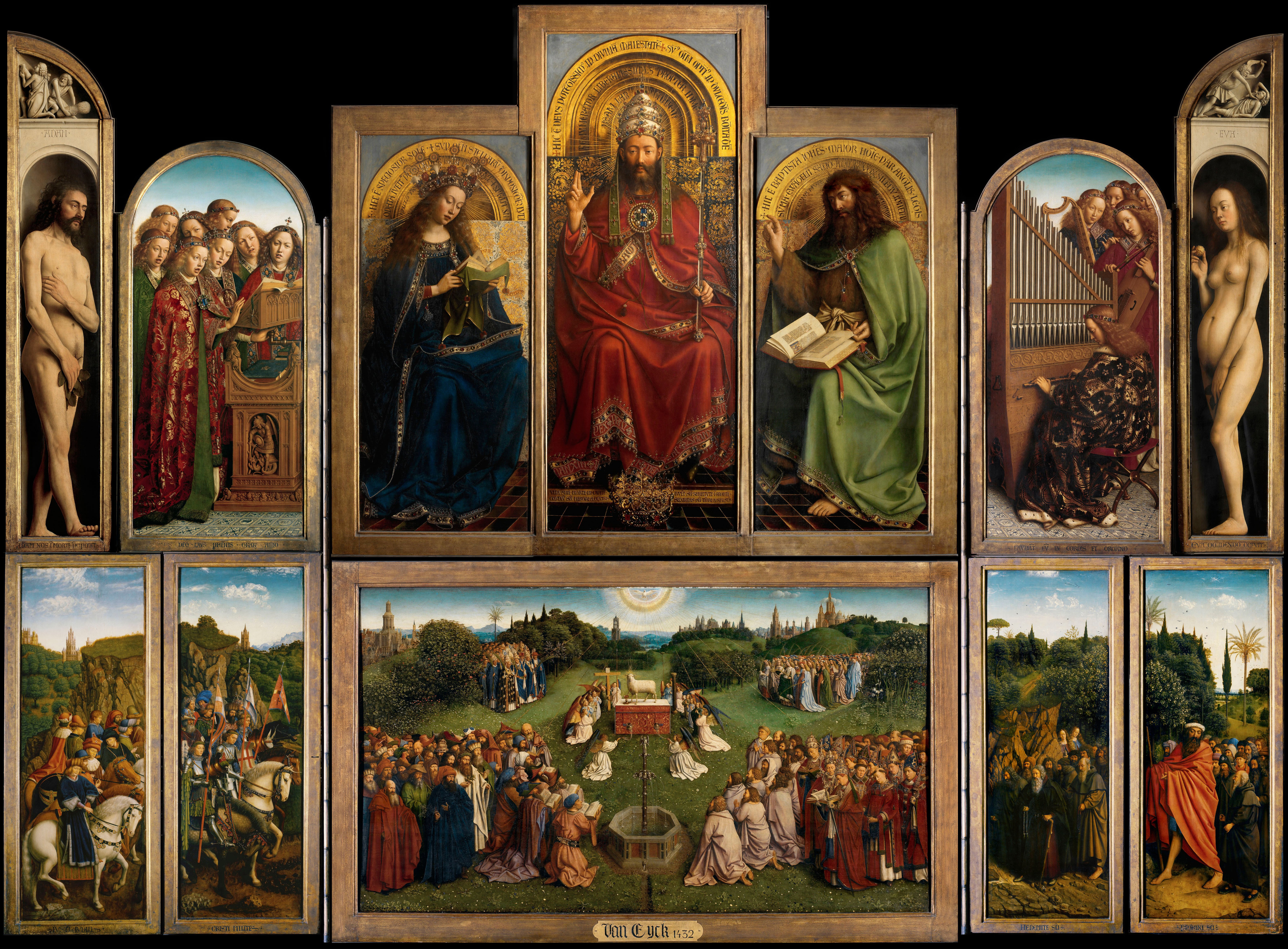
The twelve interior panels. This open view measures 5.2 m × 3.75 m (17.1 ft × 12.3 ft).

Closed view, back panels

The cathedral is noted for the Ghent Altarpiece, originally in the Joost Vijd Chapel. It is formally known as the Adoration of the Mystic Lamb after its lower centre panel by Hubert and Jan van Eyck. This work is considered Van Eyck's masterpiece and one of the most important works of the early Northern Renaissance, as well as one of the greatest artistic masterpieces of Belgium. Part of the painting, the lowermost left panel known as The Just Judges, was stolen in 1934 and has not been recovered. It has since been replaced with a facsimile by Jef Van der Veken.

=== Other religious art ===
The cathedral is home to the works of other artists of note. It holds the painting Saint Bavo enters the Convent at Ghent by Peter Paul Rubens. There are also works by or after Lucas de Heere, one of which is a View of Gent. Frans Pourbus the Elder painted 14 panels representing the History of Saint Andrew (1572) and a Triptych of Viglius Aytta (1571). Caspar de Crayer is represented by paintings of St Macarius of Gent, The Beheading of Saint John the Baptist and The Martyrdom of Saint Barbara. The church also holds works by Antoon van den Heuvel including the Christ and the Adulterous Woman and the Resurrection of Christ. There are also works by Lucas van Uden and Jan van Cleef.

Local Ghent painter Petrus Norbertus van Reysschoot painted a series of eleven grisailles, which decorate the choir of the cathedral, above the stalls. Five of these panels represent scenes from the Old Testament while the other six episodes from the New Testament. These paintings were placed in the cathedral between 1789 and 1791.

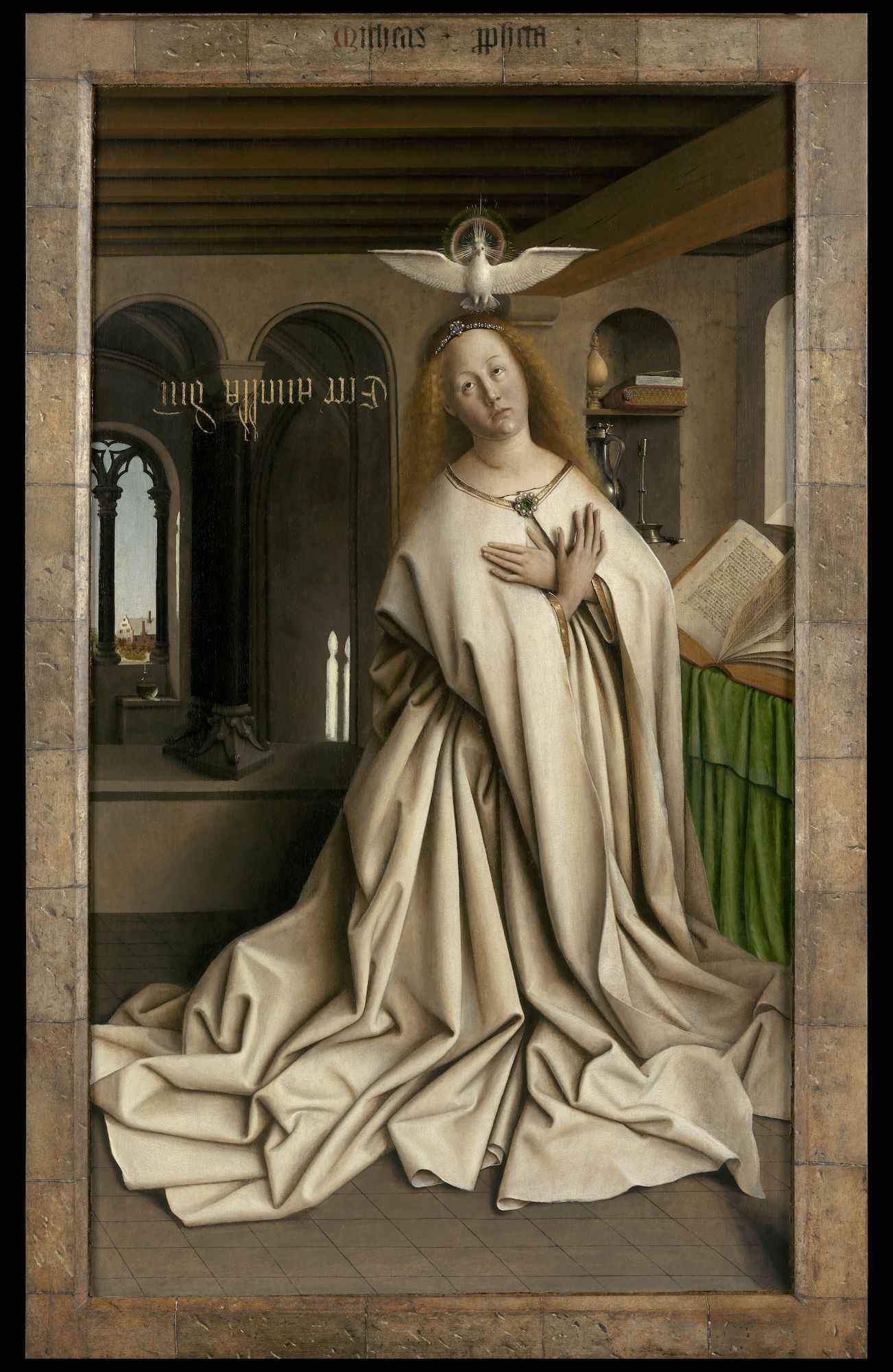
The Ghent Altarpiece

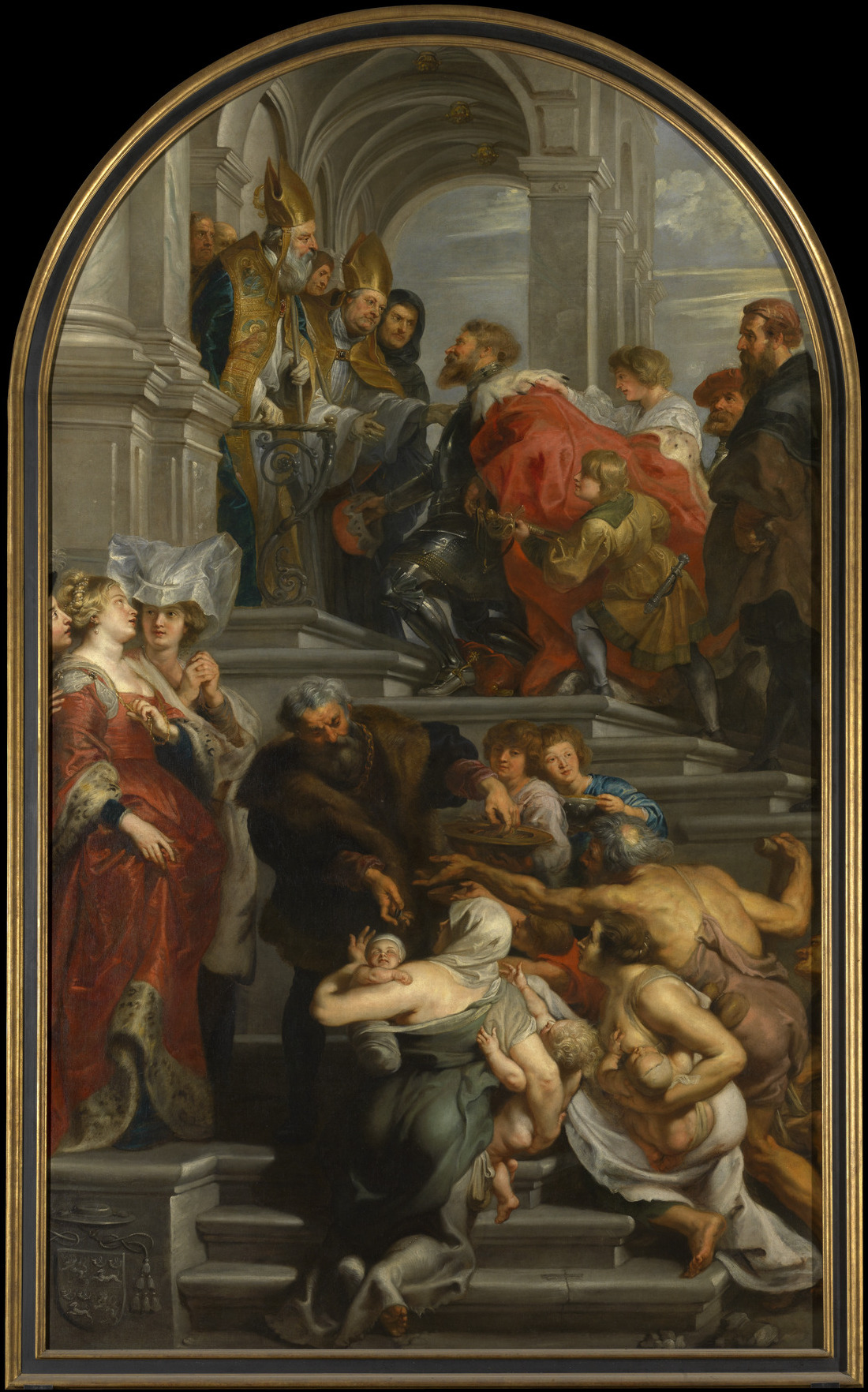
Saint Bavo enters the Convent at Ghent by Peter Paul Rubens

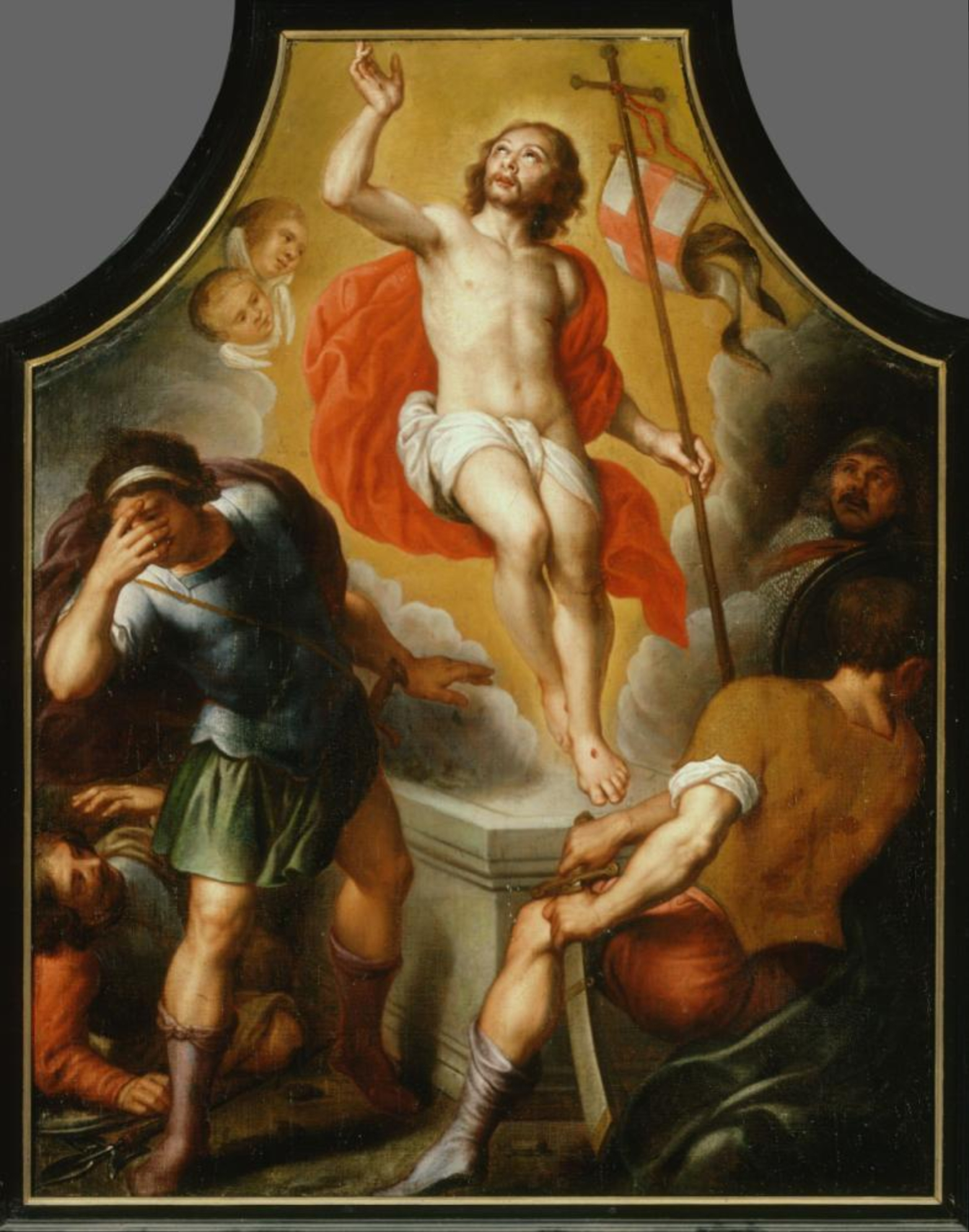
Resurrection of Christ by Antoon van den Heuvel

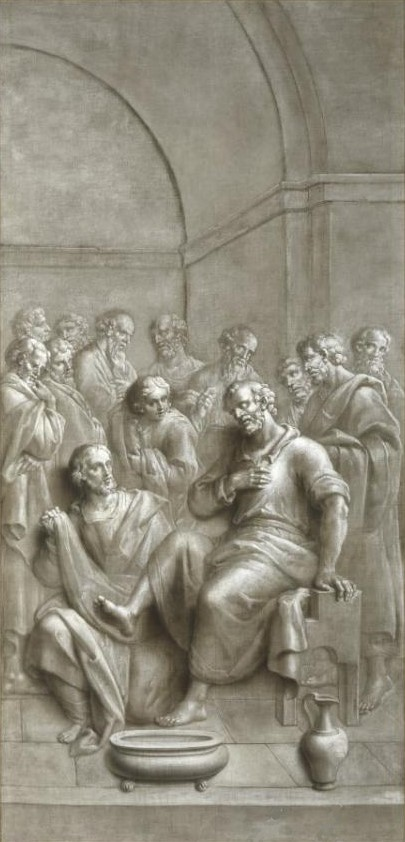
The Washing of the Feet by Petrus Norbertus van Reysschoot

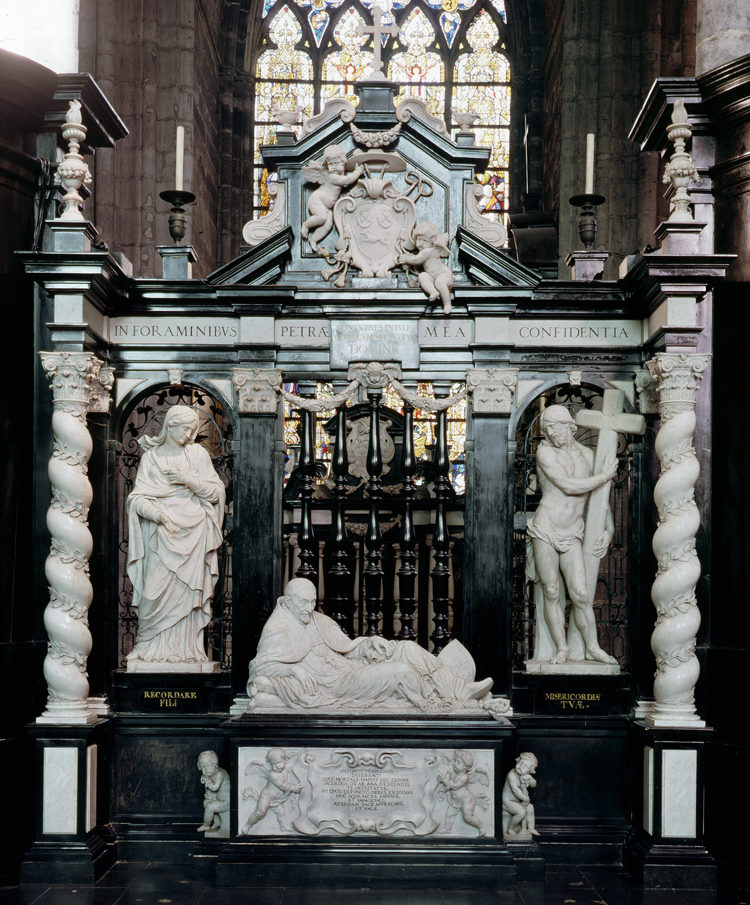
Tomb of Monsignor Antonius Triest by Jérôme Duquesnoy the Younger

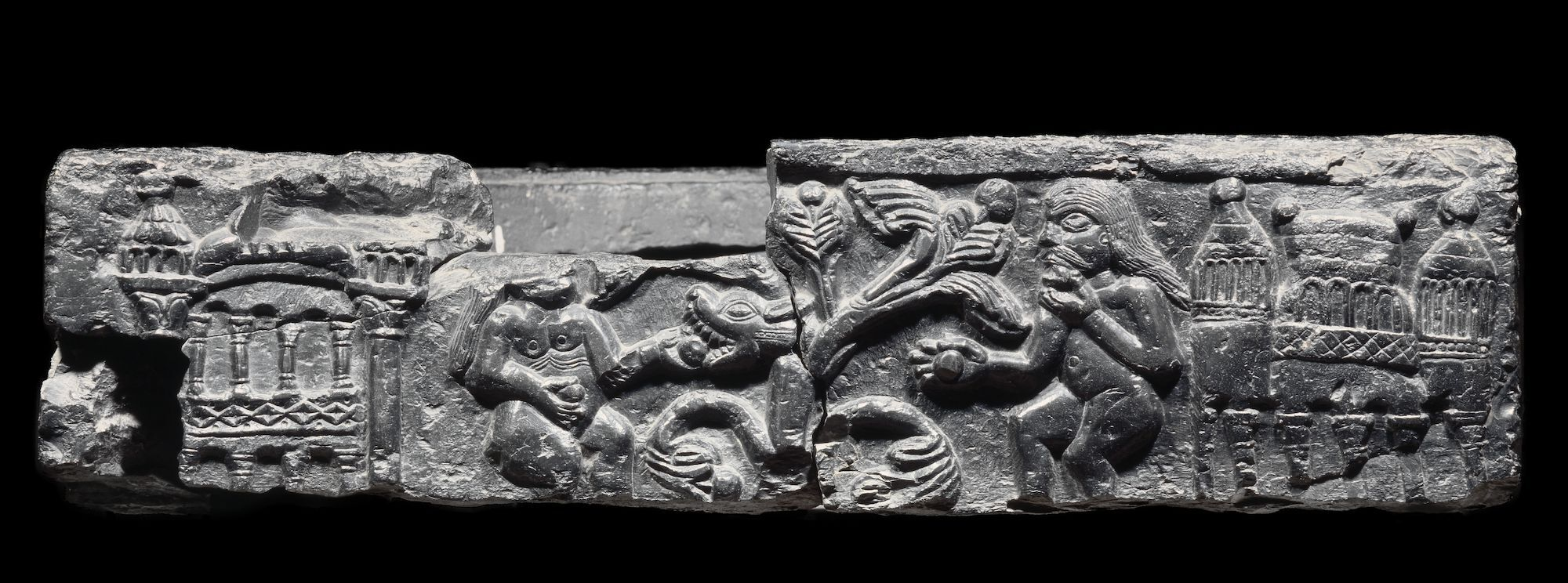
Detail of a baptismal font

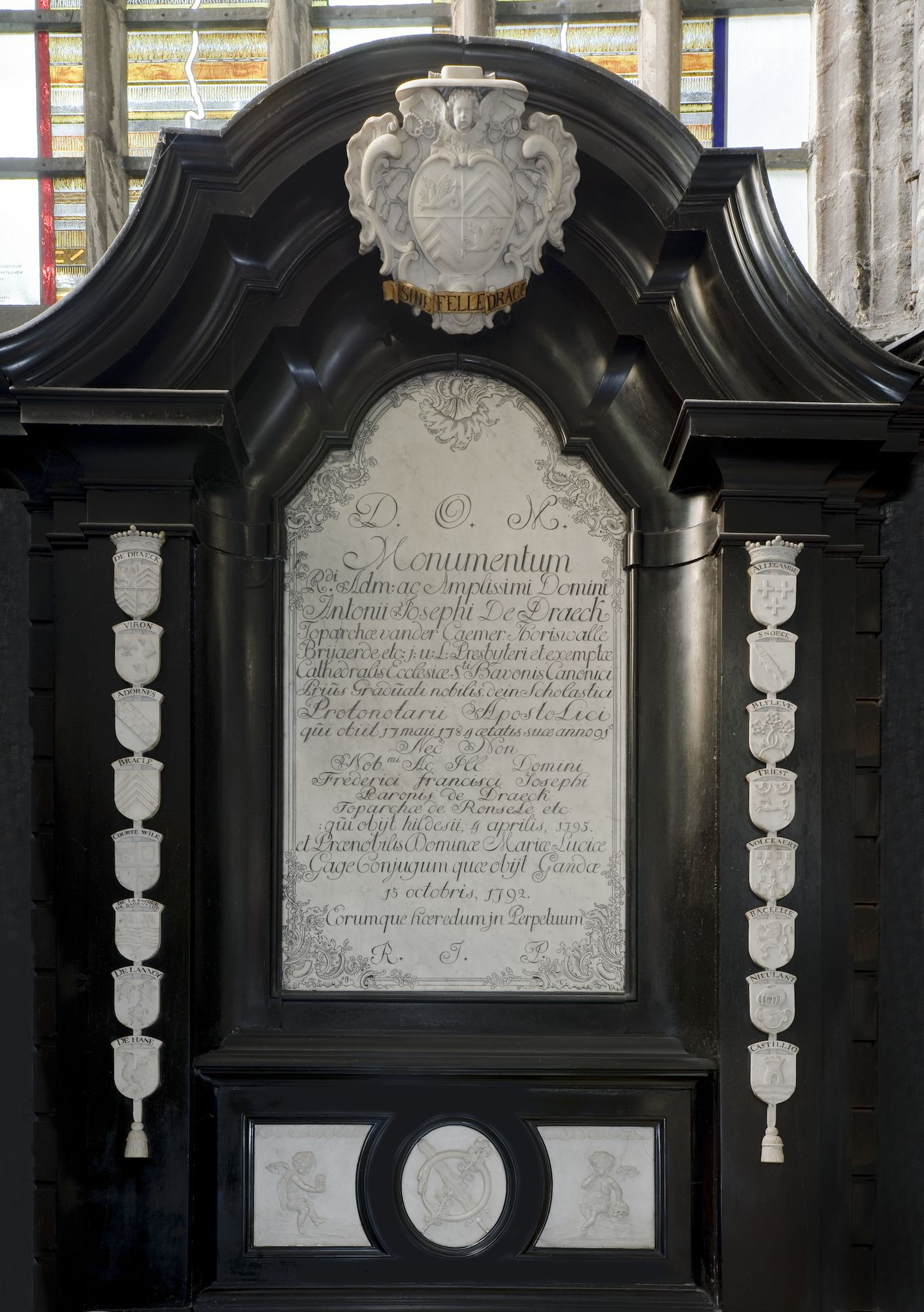
Epitaph of the De Draeck family

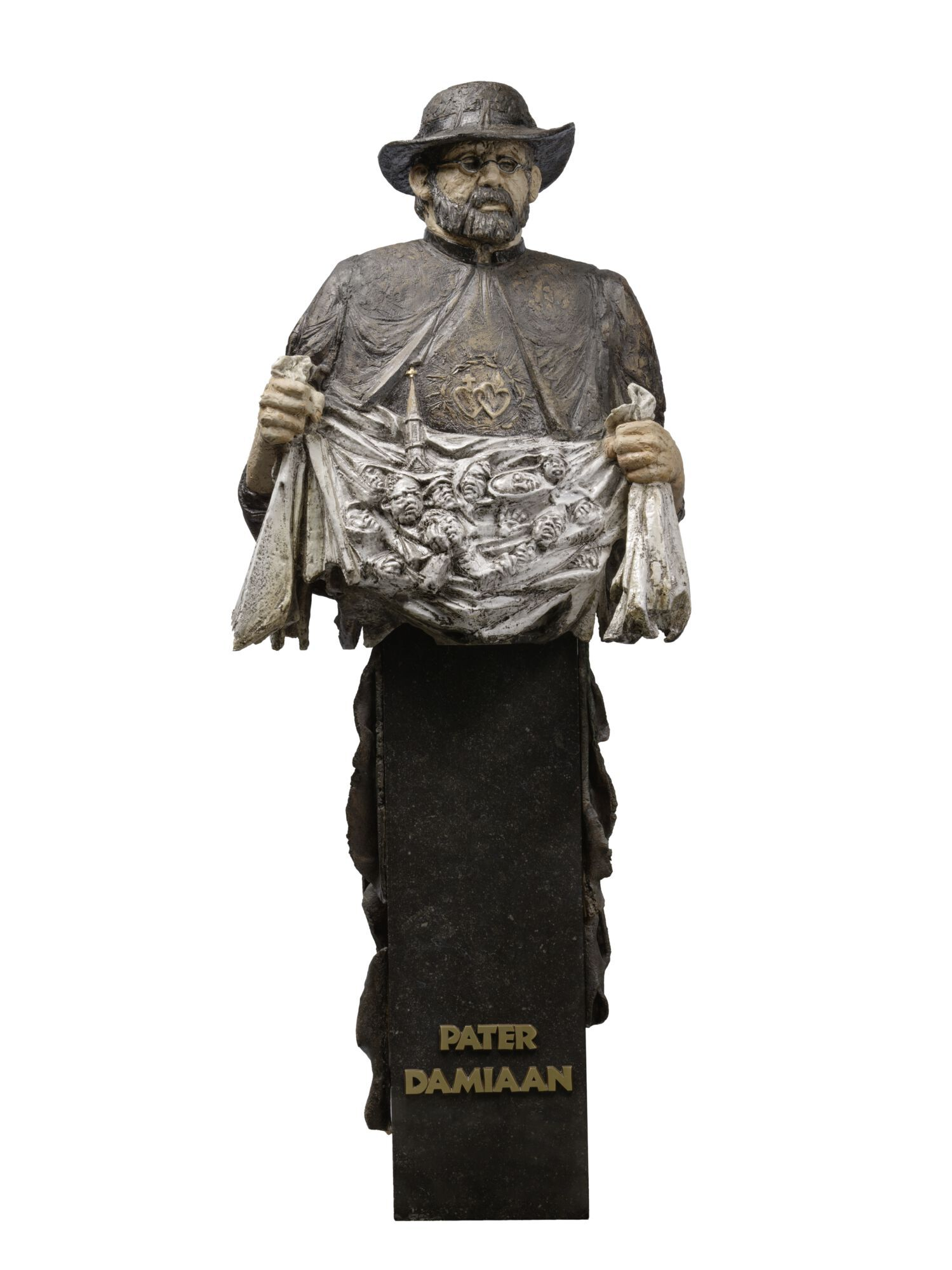
Father Damien

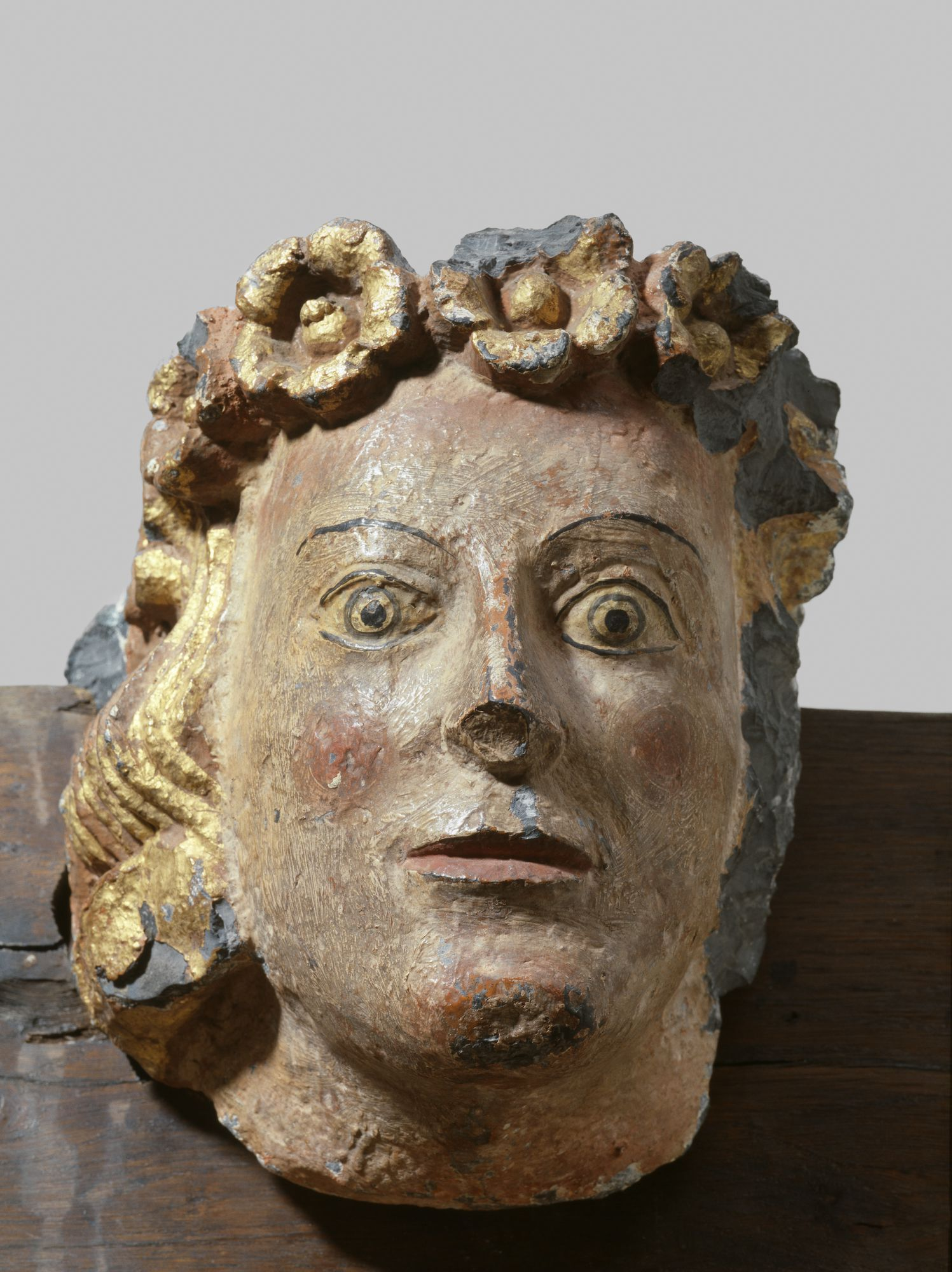
Stone female head

== Chapter of Saint-Bavo ==
Still today the chapter is housed inside the cathedral, since its foundation. Members have been important prelates and members of noble houses. Today Jozef De Kesel is one of the honorary canons. The chapters of Haarlem and Ghent are united in friendship. Weekly the canons sing Mass with the bishop.

- Maximilian van de Woestyne de Becelaere, died 1699: nephew of the Marquess of Becelaere
- Jacques Ignace van Parys, died 1702: grandson of Rubens.
- Constant van Crombrugghe
- François III Maria Rubens, died 1720: great-grandson of Rubens.
- Petrus Joseph Triest, founder of the Brothers of Charity
- Thomas-Philip d'Alsace, Cardinal
- Antoon Stillemans, before he was ordained bishop
- Gustaaf Joos, before he was created cardinal
- Jozef De Kesel, honorary Canon
- Lode Aerts, before he was ordained bishop
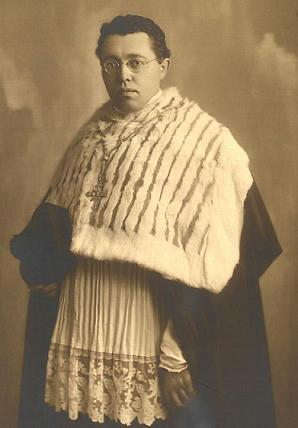
Karel Justinus Calewaert, canon of St. Bavo

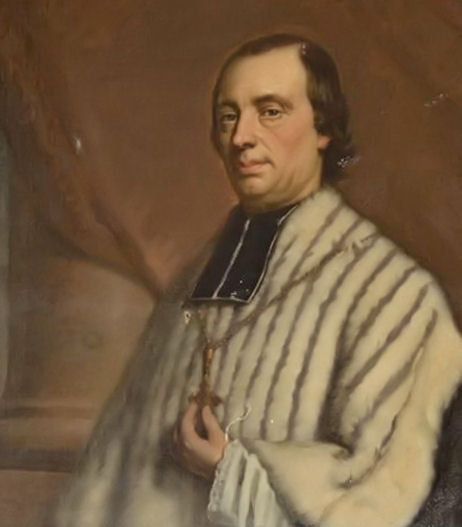
Constant van Crombrugghe, canon of Ghent

== Burials ==
- Cornelius Jansen (1510–1576), first Bishop of Ghent (1565–1576)
- Pieter Damant (1530–1609), third Bishop of Ghent (1589–1609)
- Karl vanden Bosch, Bishop of Ghent
- Karel Justinus Calewaert, (1893–1963): 27th Bishop of Ghent (1948–1963)
- Prince Ferdinand de Lobkowitz (1726–1795) Bishop of Ghent, 1779–1795
- Philippus Erardus van der Noot, baroque tomb by Jan Boeksent.
- Jan de Smet, Bishop of Ghent
- Jan-Frans van de Velde (1779–1838), 20th Bishop of Ghent.
- Gerard van Eersel (died 1778), Bishop of Ghent
- Ignace Schetz de Grobbendonk (1625–1680), 11th Bishop of Ghent (1679–1680)
- Michelle of Valois, Duchess of Burgundy

== See also ==
- Bishop of Ghent
- List of Gothic Cathedrals in Europe
- List of tallest structures built before the 20th century
