= Van Landeghem (surname) =

Van Landeghem is a Dutch surname. Notable people with the name include:

- Alfred Van Landeghem, Belgian rower
- Chantal Van Landeghem (born 1994), Canadian freestyle and butterfly swimmer
- Jan Van Landeghem (born 1954), Belgian composer
- Ria Van Landeghem (born 1957), Belgian long-distance runner

== See also ==
- Landingham
