= Nijs =

Nijs is a Dutch patronymic surname originating from the given name "Nijs", a short form of Denijs (Denis). An alternative spelling is Nys. People with this name include:

== Surname ==
- Adriaan Nijs (1683–1771), Flemish sculptor
- Annette Nijs (born 1961), Dutch politician
- Johan Nijs (born 1963), Belgian composer and conductor
- Lenie de Nijs (1939–2023), Dutch swimmer
- Philips Alexander Nijs (1724–1805), Flemish sculptor
- Pierre Nijs (1890 –1939), Belgian water polo player
- Pieter Nijs (1624–1681), Dutch painter
- Suzanne Nijs (1897–1983), Dutch-Belgian sculptor

== Given name ==
- Nijs Korevaar (1927–2016), Dutch water polo player

== See also ==
- De Nijs (surname)
- Nijssen (surname)
- Sven Nys (born 1976), Belgian cyclo-cross racer sometimes spelled Sven Nijs
