= Castle of Temse =

Old castle in Belgium

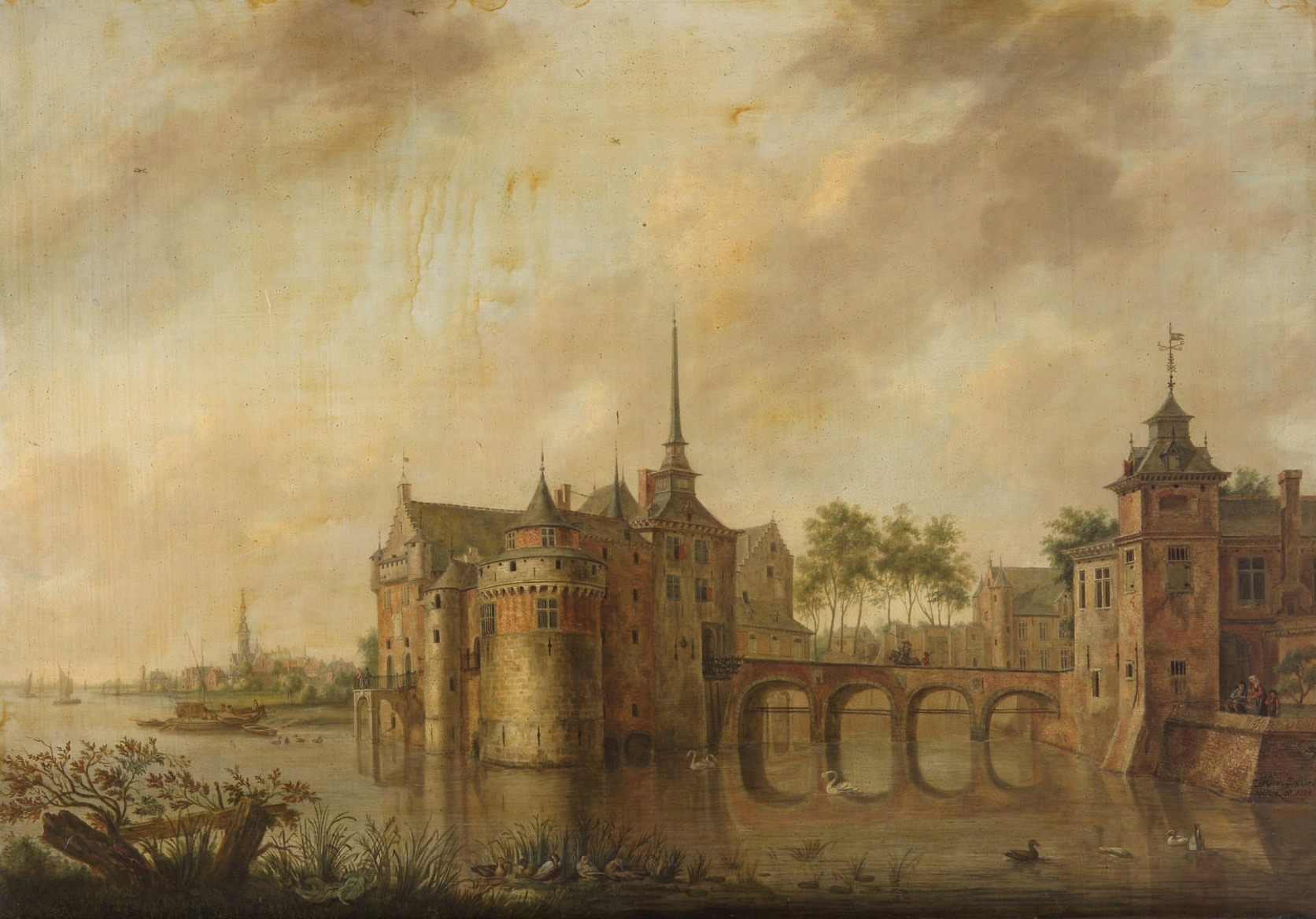
The old castle of Temse in 1774, by Hendrik Frans de Cort. This painting belonged to Prince Charles of Lorraine, governor of the Austrian Netherlands

The Castle of Temse also known as 'the (old) castle', 'Arcques', 'Hercken' or 'Herkenstein', was a castle/moated castle that was located on the left bank of the Scheldt in Temse. It existed before the 12th century and was demolished in 1782. More to the north of the old castle, a new castle was built from 1783 to 1787 in classicist style, which in turn was demolished in 1965 to make way for the swimming pool of Temse. There are no remnants of the old castle, except for the current Scheldt Park, which belonged to the domain of the old and new castle. A model of the old castle can be seen in the municipal museum of Temse.

== Gallery ==
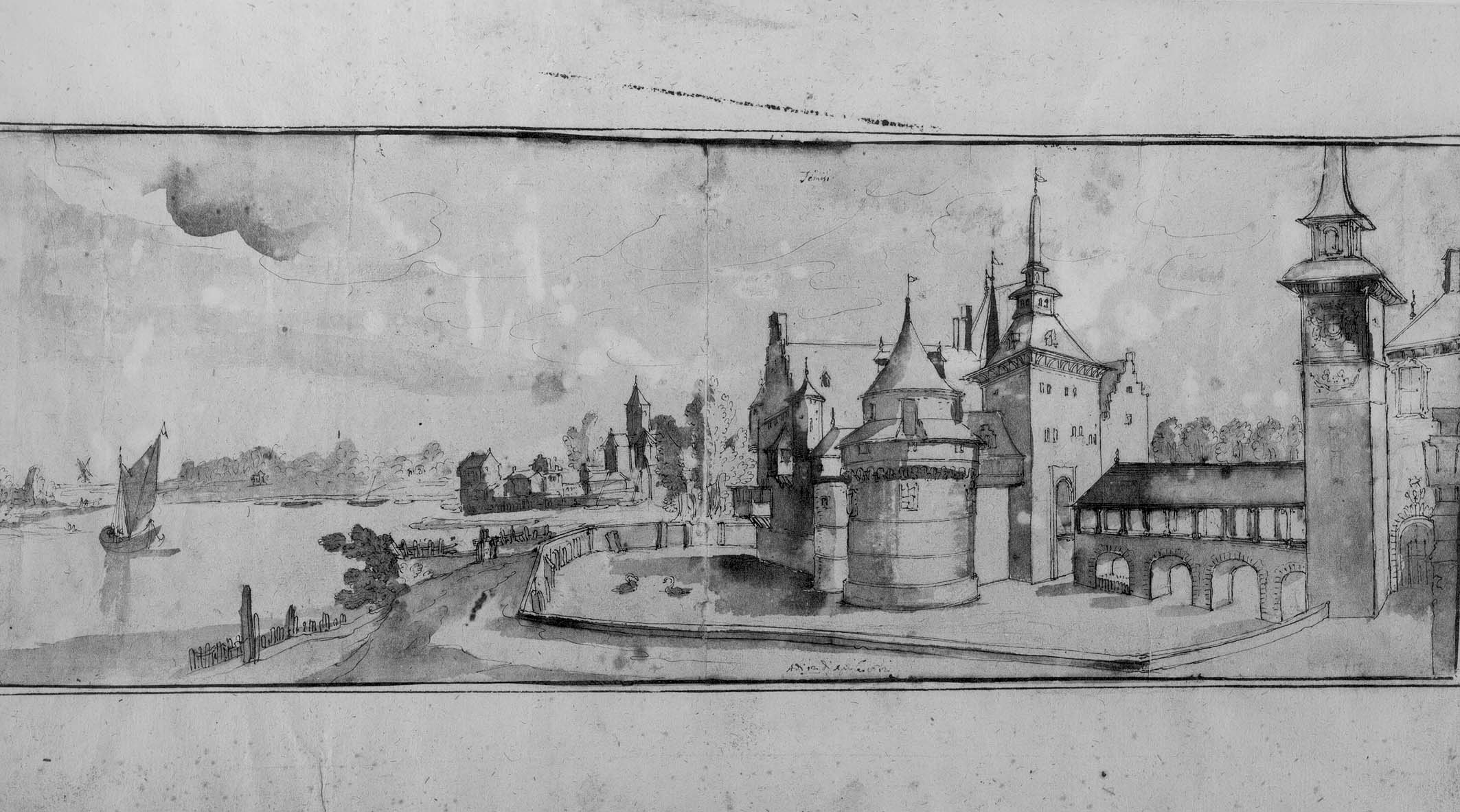
View of the old castle of Temse in 1612, by the Italian draftsman Remigio Cantagallina

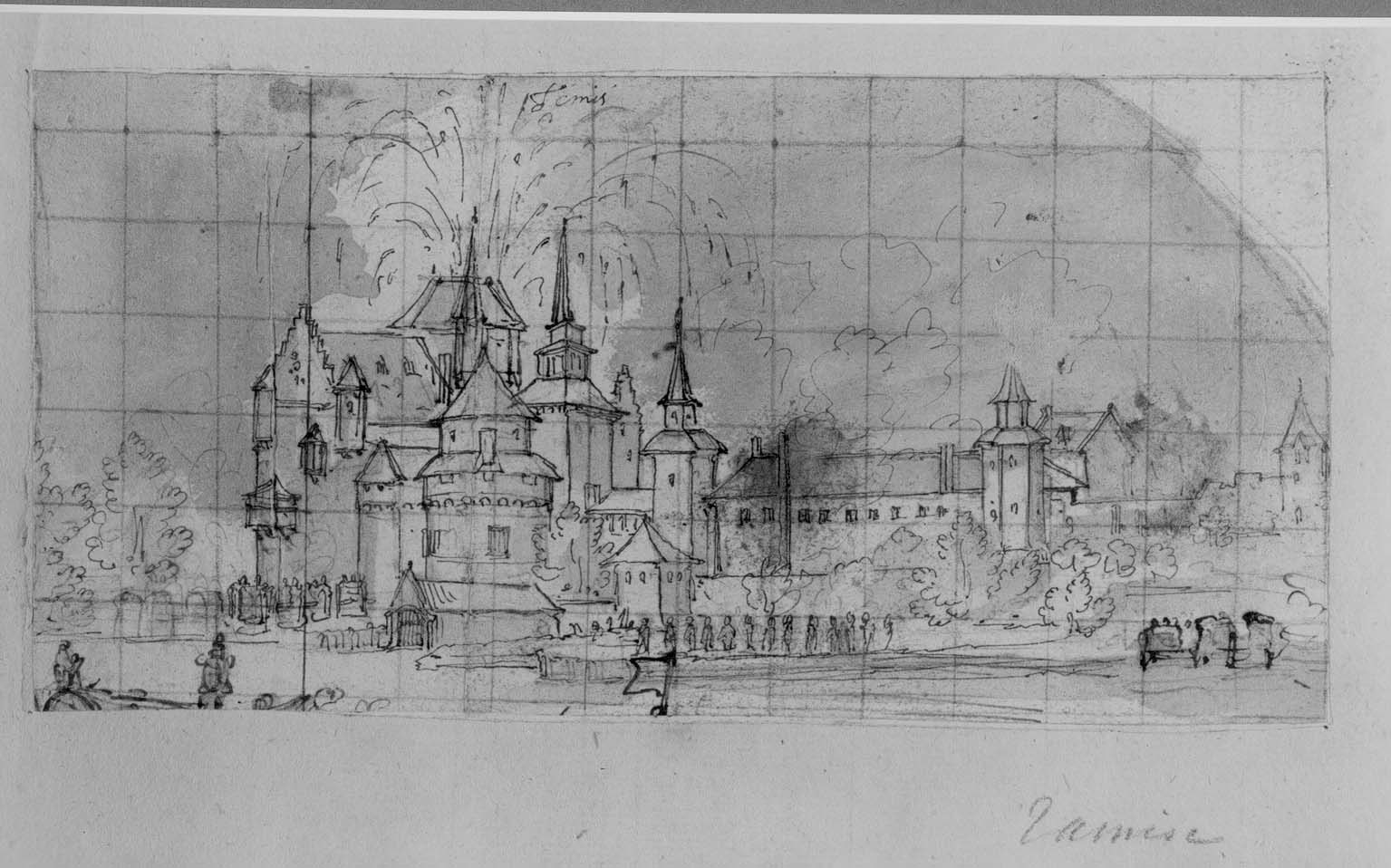
View of the old castle of Temse during a fireworks display - 1612 - Remigio Cantagallina

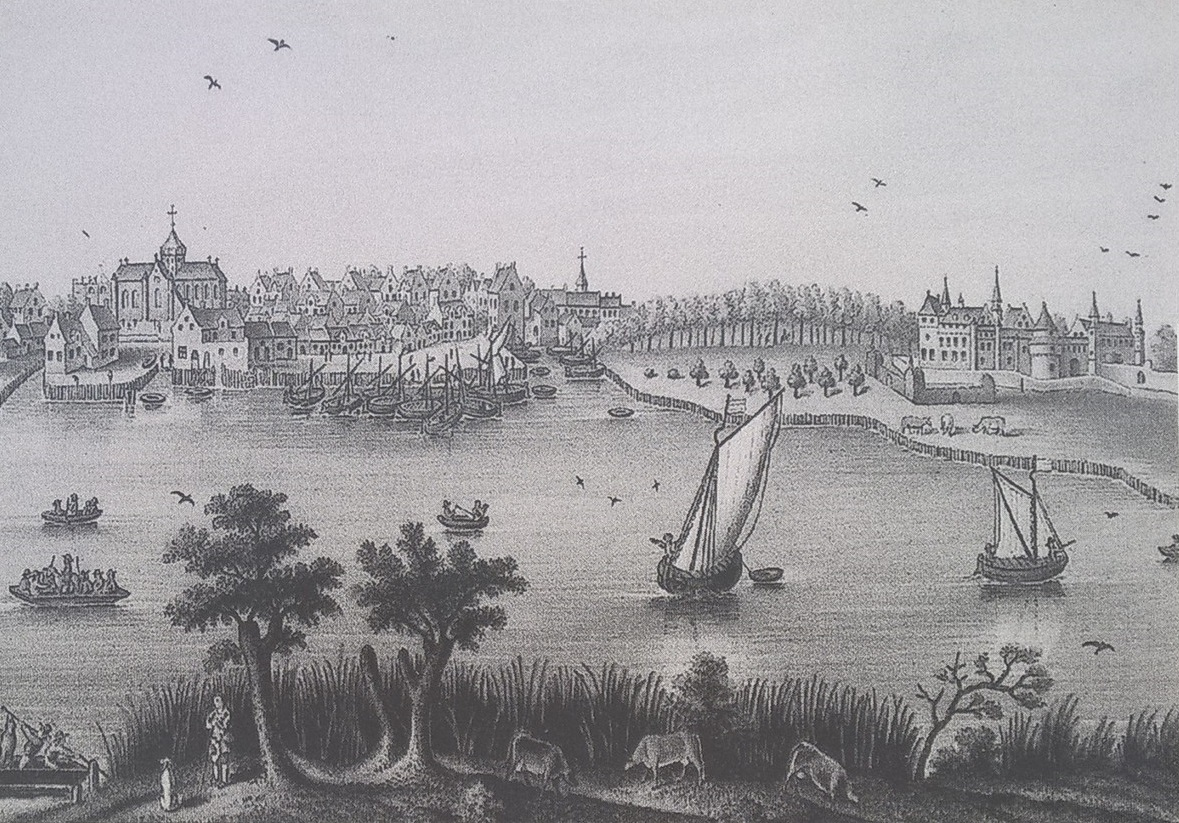
The old castle of Temse is depicted on the right of the oldest painting of Temse - 1621

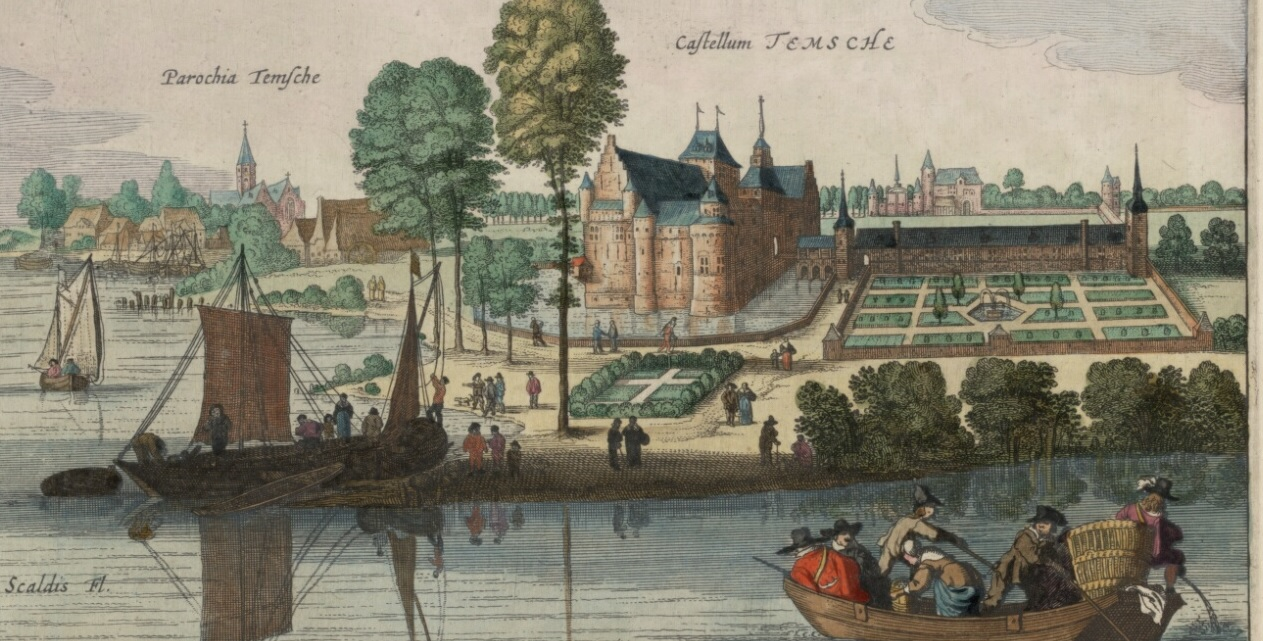
View of the old castle of Temse in Flandria Illustrata (1641)

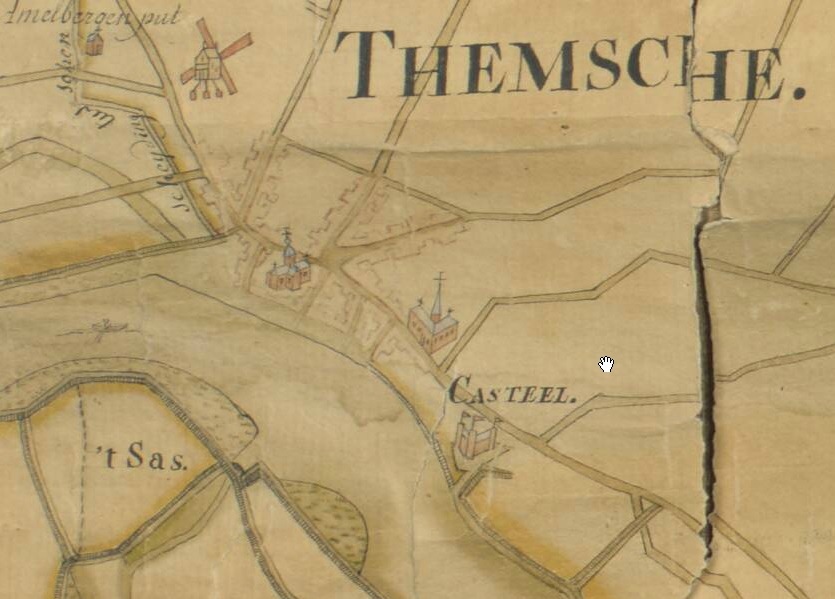
The old castle of Temse on a map from 1772

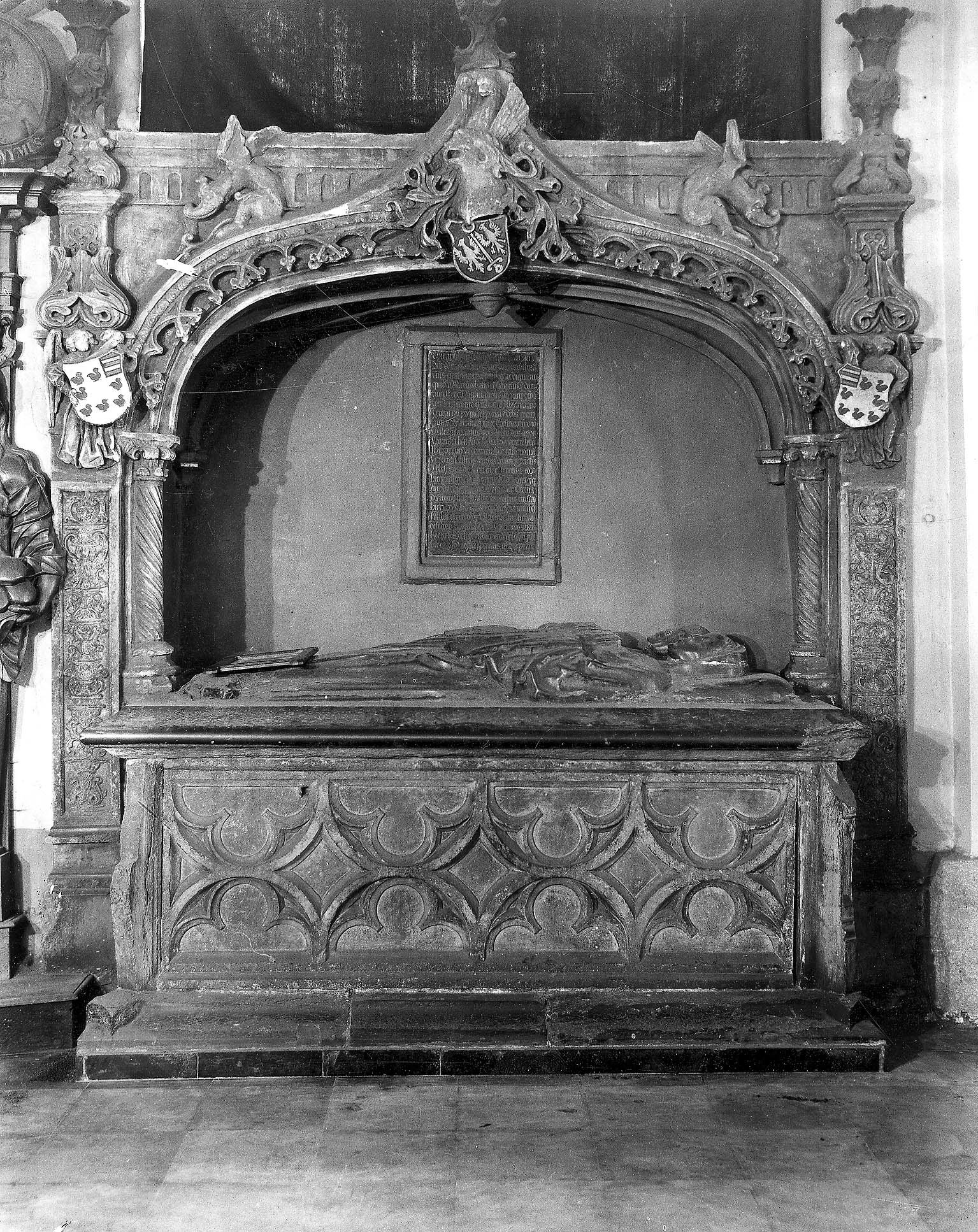
Tomb of Roeland Lefevre, owner of the castle of Temse, in the Church of Our Lady of Temse (1517)
