= Léon Corthals =

Belgian painter

- Born: Léon Corthals ca. 1877; Temse, Belgium
- Died: ca. 1935; Elsene, Belgium
- Occupation: Painter

Léon Corthals (1877 – 1935) was a Belgian painter.

Corthals was born in Temse in 1877. He painted a portrait of Leopold III of Belgium on 23 February 1934, the day of his ascension to the Belgian throne.

He died in Elsene in 1935.

== Gallery ==
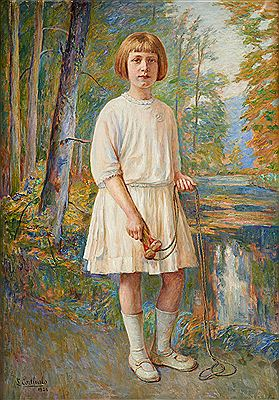
Young Girl with a Skipping Rope on a Park Background, oil on canvas

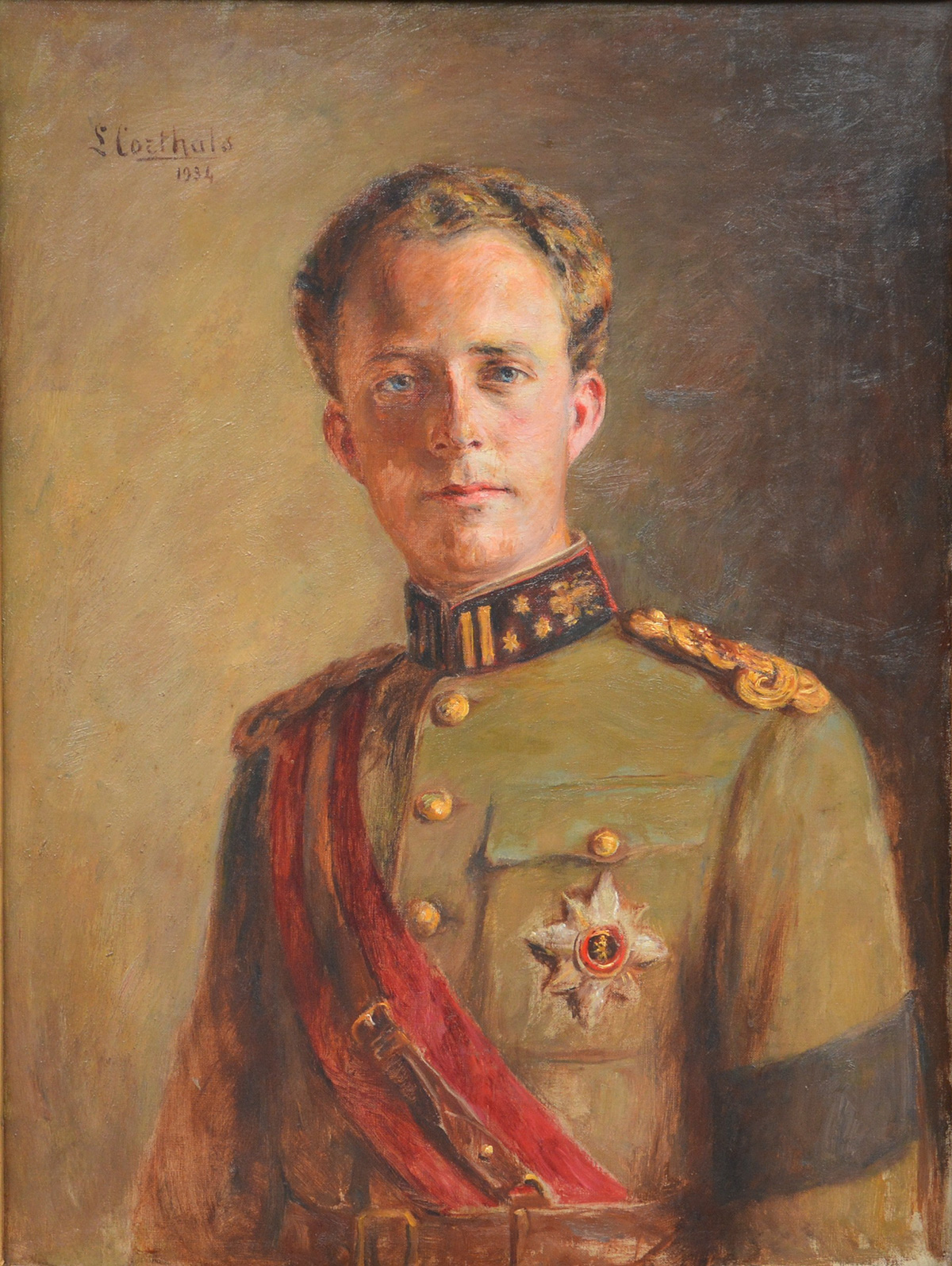
Portrait of H.M. Leopold III, King of the Belgians, 1934, detail

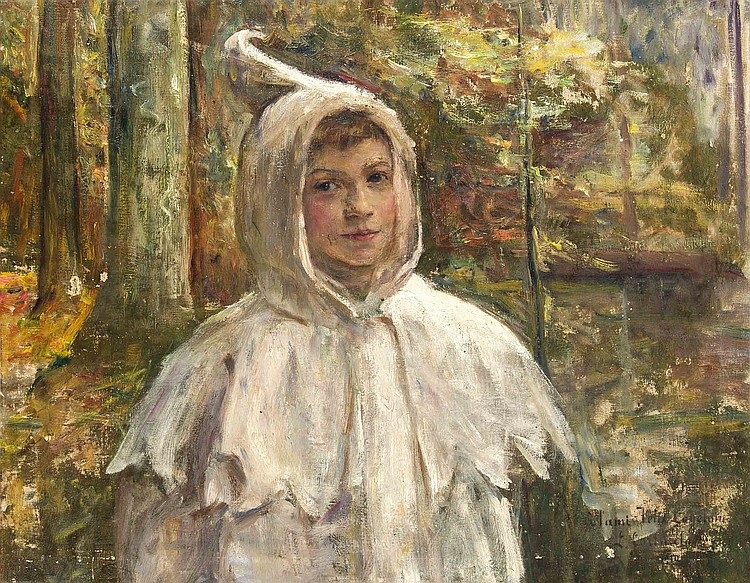
Portrait of a boy with a cape at a forest lake, 1916

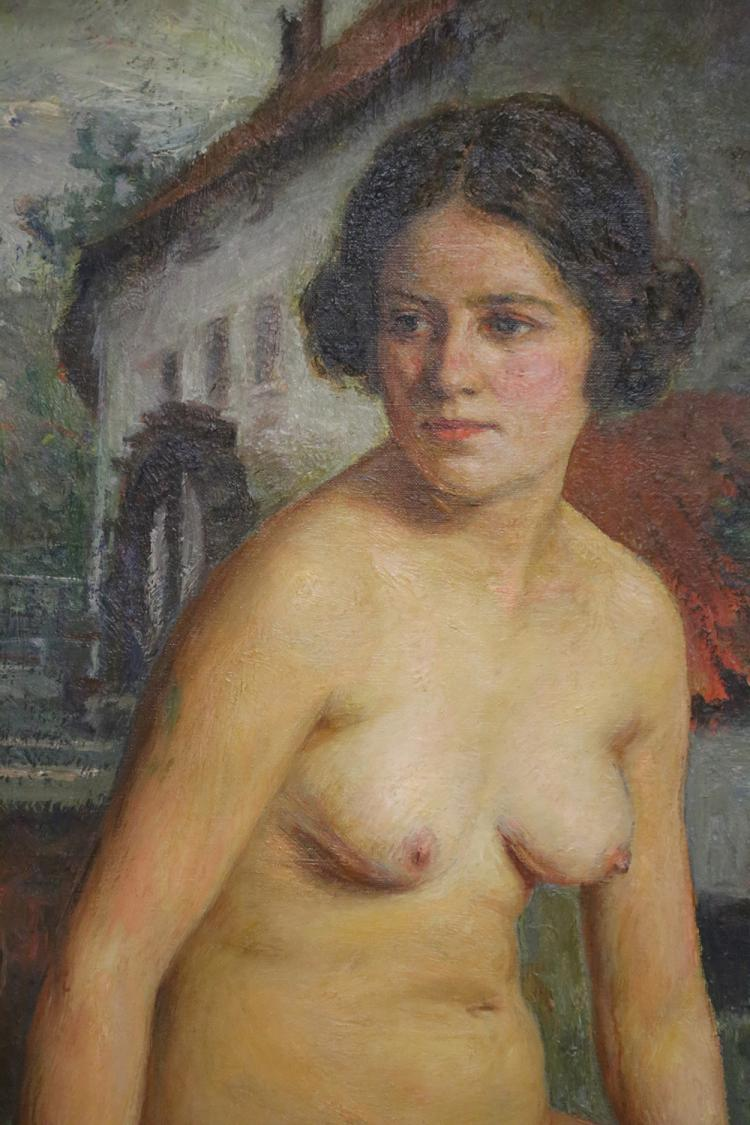
Susanne Nue, oil on canvas, detail

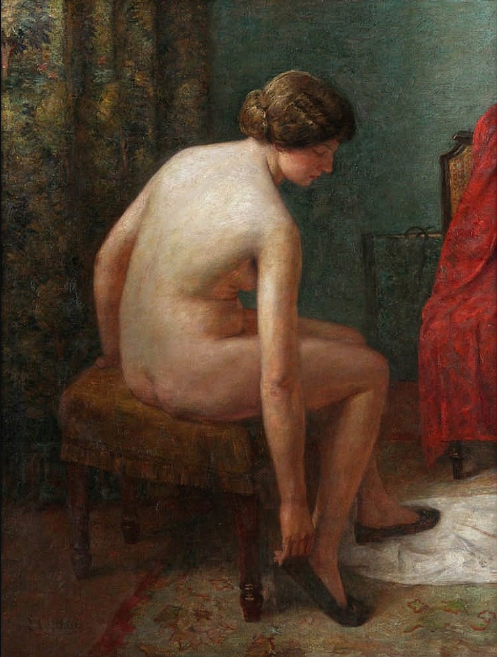
Seated nude, oil o canvas
