= Church of Our Lady, Temse =

Church of Our Lady
- Onze-Lieve-Vrouwekerk
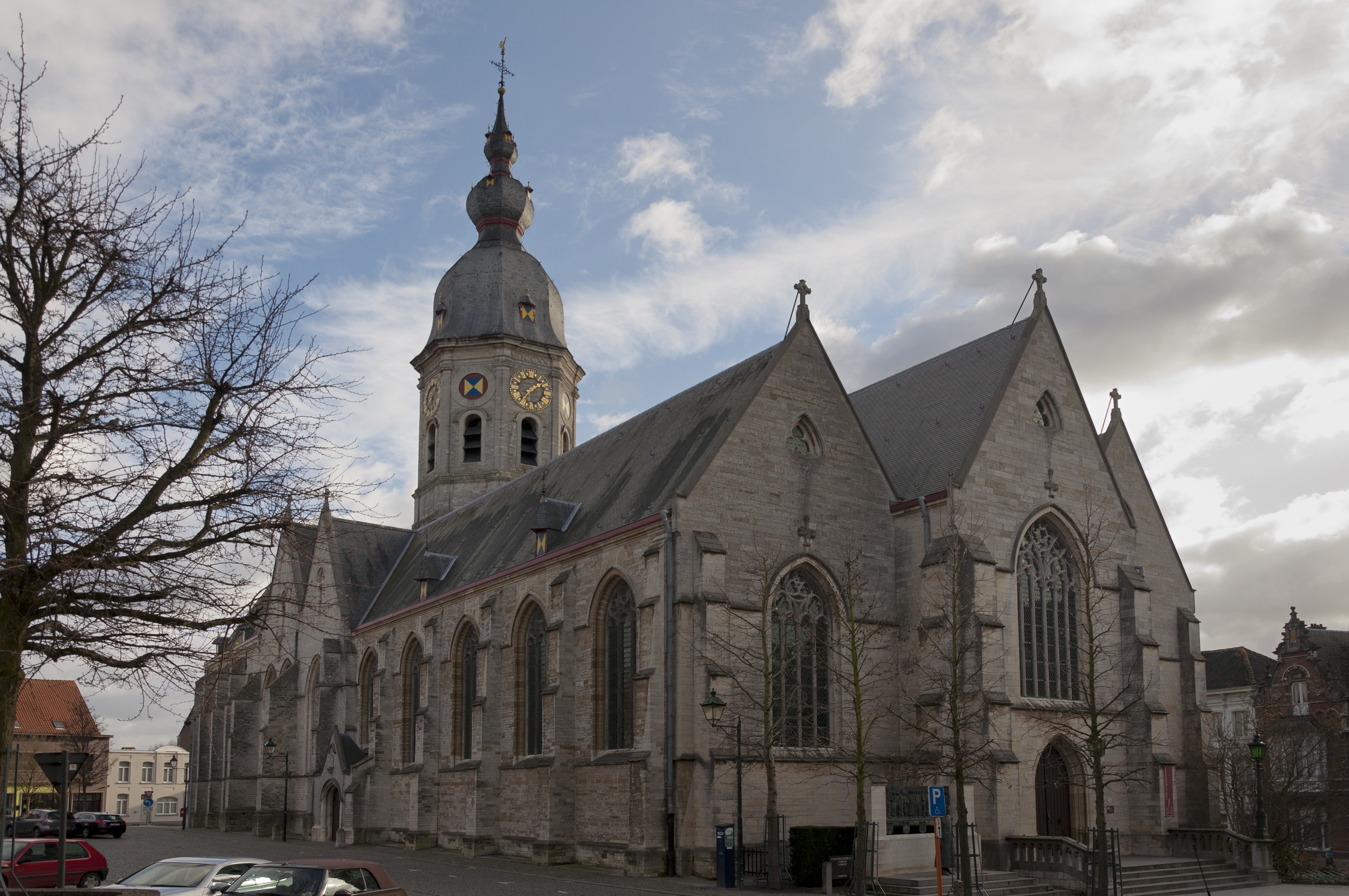
- The Church of Our Lady in 2012

- Location within Belgium

General information
- Architectural style: Romanesque; Gothic; Baroque
- Location: Market (no number), Temse, Belgium
- Coordinates: 51°7′27″N 4°12′50″E

The Church of Our Lady (Dutch: Onze-Lieve-Vrouwekerk) is a church in the Belgian municipality of Temse. It is dedicated to the Virgin Mary and its foundation, which is presumed to date to 770, is attributed to Amalberga of Temse.

== History ==
This three-aisled hall church has a complex building history. Excavations in 1979 discovered a semicircular Romanesque apse. It is thought that other old parts are hidden under the plaster. From the later Romanesque period have been preserved the three-aisled cruciform church with an eight-sided crossing tower and choir with a semicircular apse. Tournai limestone was incorporated in the facades of the southern transept.

Philip the Fair granted a special tax in 1496 to pay for the repair and reconstruction of the church after heavy fire damage. The choir is thought to date from the 1496 reconstruction, while the choir on the northern side dates from 1591. In the 17th century the crossing tower was in poor condition. The repair was paid for through a levy of tithes by Saint Peter's Abbey in Ghent. It was rebuilt under engineer Anton Wauters, after a design by Adriaan Nijs. The choir on the southern side was added in 1842, and, also in the 19th century, parts of the church were extended and a baptistery, a northern portal, a southern stair tower, and sacristy (south) were also added. In 1979 the church was thoroughly restored, with roofing and drainage renewed.

Inside the church there is an 18th-century sculpture by Adriaan Nijs and his son Philips Alexander and a mausoleum from 1517 of Roeland Lefèvre, the first lord of Temse. Silverware and a number of paintings, including one by Cornelis Schut, can also be seen. It was the church of Schut's parents-in-law. Near the church is a statue of priest Edward Poppe.
