= Nijssen =

Nijssen is a Dutch patronymic surname originating from the given name "Denijs" (Denis). People with this surname include:

Nijssen

- Han Nijssen (1935–2013), Dutch ichthyologist
- Sjir Nijssen (born 1938), Dutch computer scientist known for Nijssen's Information Analysis Method
- Tom Nijssen (born 1964), Dutch tennis player

Nyssen

- Hubert Nyssen (1925–2011), Belgian writer and publisher

== See also ==
- De Nijs
- Nijs
- Nissen (surname)
