= Charles Nissens =

Belgian architect (1858–1919)

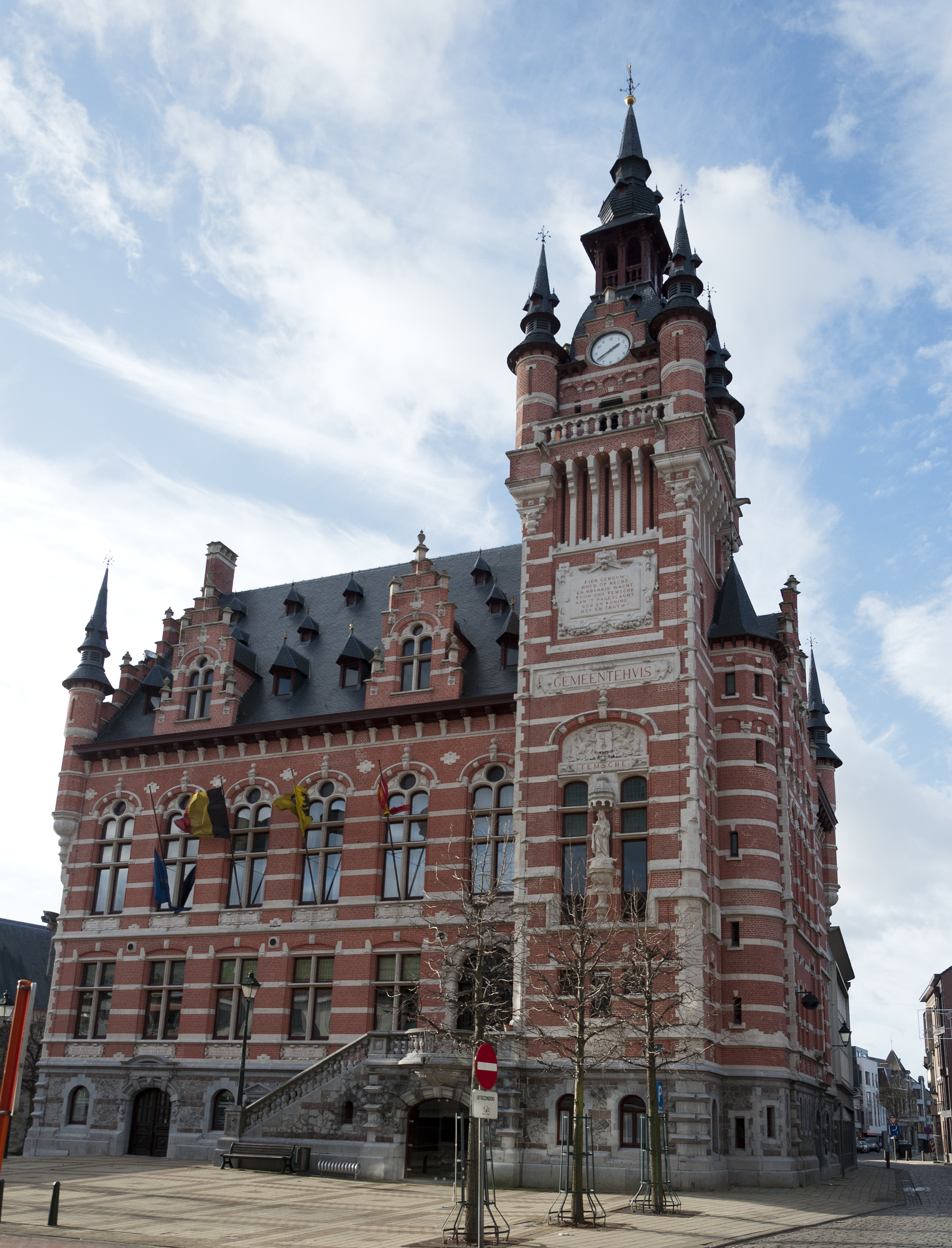
Town hall of Temse

Carolus (Charles) Ludovicus Nissens (11 July 1858 – 1919) was a Belgian architect.

He mainly designed bourgeois houses in neo-renaissance and eclectic style. Well-known works by him include the Huis Pieter De Coninck in Sint-Niklaas (1902), the town hall of Temse (1905) and the rectory of Kruibeke (1906).

== Gallery ==
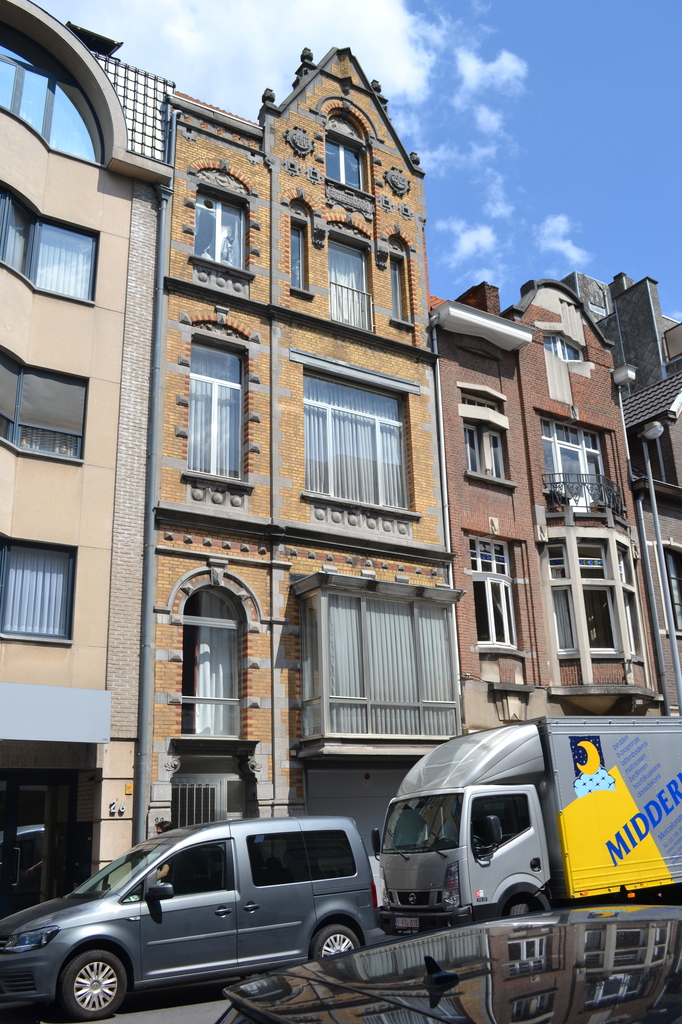
Huis Pieter De Coninck, Sint-Niklaas (1902)

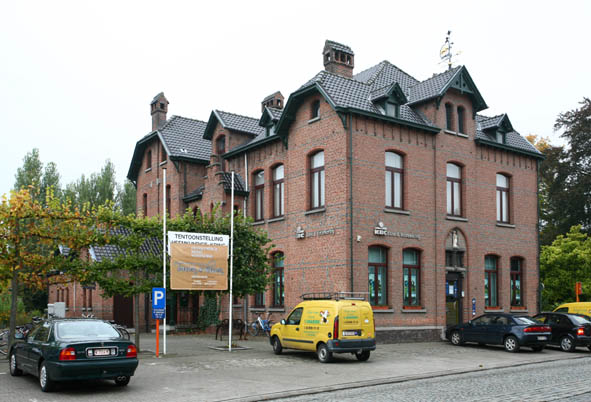
Rectory of Kruibeke (1906)
