= De Nijs =

De Nijs is a Dutch patronymic surname originating from the given name "Denijs" (=Denis). Notable people with this surname include:

- E. Breton de Nijs, pseudonym of Rob Nieuwenhuys (1908–1999), Dutch writer of Indo descent
- Jack de Nijs (1941–1997), Dutch musician known by the name "Jack Jersey"
- Jan de Nijs (born 1958), Dutch cyclist
- Judith de Nijs (born 1942), Dutch swimmer, sister of Lenie
- Lenie de Nijs (1939–2023), Dutch swimmer, sister of Judith
- Rob de Nijs (born 1942), Dutch singer and actor

== See also ==
- Denys
- Nijs
- Nijssen
