= Edward Poppe =

Belgian beatified priest

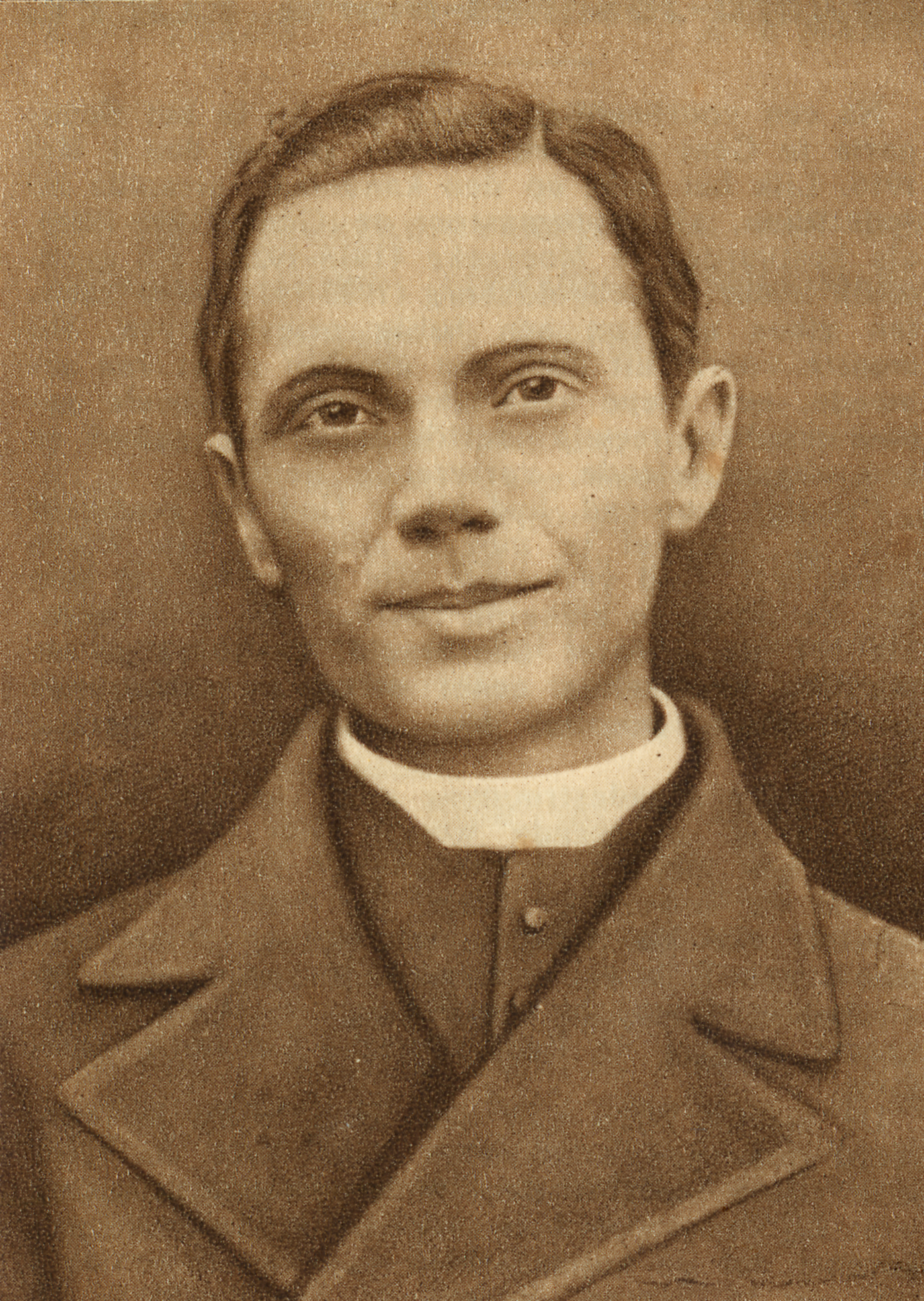

Priest
- Born: 18 December 1890; Temse, East Flanders, Belgium
- Died: 10 June 1924 (aged 33); Moerzeke, Hamme, Belgium
- Venerated in: Roman Catholic Church
- Beatified: 3 October 1999, Saint Peter's Square, Vatican City by Pope John Paul II
- Feast: 10 June
- Attributes: Priest's attire
- Patronage: Moerzeke; Laborers; Military chaplains

Edward Poppe (18 December 1890 – 10 June 1924) was a Belgian Catholic priest who advocated for the frequent reception of the sacraments and established a children's league dedicated to the Eucharist; he was a noted critic of Marxism and materialism as well as rampant secularism in his region. As a writer and pastor, he advocated for the rights of common laborers. He started his ministry in Ghent, but ill health forced him to move. He died from a stroke at the age of 33.

Poppe's cause for beatification opened on 5 April 1966 under Pope Paul VI. Pope John Paul II declared him as venerable on 30 June 1986. The same pope beatified Poppe in Saint Peter's Square on 3 October 1999.

== Early life and education ==
Edward Joannes Maria Poppe was born in Temse on 18 December 1890 as the third of eight children to the baker Dèsirè Aloies Poppe and Josepha Ogiers. One brother became a priest, five sisters were nuns, and one daughter remained home alone with her mother.

He was an energetic child and an excellent student. His mischievousness saw him often knock things over even putting himself at risk of being harmed. He was also quite stubborn and never left his sisters alone though his sisters would often get back at him and would muss up his hair when he was caught combing in front of the mirror. He was also a big eater and liked to devour treats from his father's store. But in 1902 he received his First Communion and Confirmation and this made him more serious which meant jokes and teasing became rarer. In spring 1904 his father introduced him to his business plans and had hoped to see his son begin a baking apprenticeship though Poppe remained silent at first though his resolution to become a priest led him to tell his father as much. Not long after a priest friend to his parents gave a favorable opinion of Poppe's vocation to which his father told his mother: "Let's not be selfish. God has not given us our children for ourselves". He studied at the Sint-Niklaas St. Joseph Minor Seminary from 1905 until 1910 where he became a member the De Klauwaerts association which was a student movement in the Flemish Movement before World War I.

Despite his father's death on 10 January 1907 he was able to continue his studies. He was drafted in September 1910 and being a seminarian made him a target for harassment (he was mocked and provoked) while his companions' vulgar nature was unendurable to him to what he called "a hell". He was also quite pained that he could not receive the Eucharist and go to Mass each week due to the service. But his time in the service still allowed for him to do his philosophical studies. He liked to read poems which was something he had done since his childhood.

He began his studies in Thomism on 13 March 1912 at the Catholic University of Leuven where he became influenced by the works of Louis de Montfort which made him a fervent devotee of the Blessed Mother of God. It was also around this time that he learnt about Thérèse of Lisieux but he also had a love for Francis of Assisi. In September 1913 he moved to the Major Seminary of Ghent for his studies where he became a member of the Filioli Caritatis which was a group of priests who aimed for holiness. On 14 July 1913 he graduated in letters and philosophical studies at Louvain.

The outbreak of World War I in 1914 saw Poppe called to arms as a battlefield nurse on 1 August but he fell ill in Namur at Bourlers on 25 August after having been at the battle site since 4 August. He was placed in an ambulance van and taken to Bourlers where the priest Castelain took care of him until December. In his period of recuperation the Germans advancing had with them several prisoners of war and he appealed to Saint Joseph that these men be freed which led to their miraculous freeing all except a Frenchman; Poppe renewed the appeal and the Frenchman returned. Father Castelain also told him about the life of Antoine Chevrier. Once he recovered he went to Mechelen to continue with his ecclesial studies in April 1915 after Cardinal Désiré-Joseph Mercier obtained for him a dispensation to leave the armed forces.

== Priesthood ==
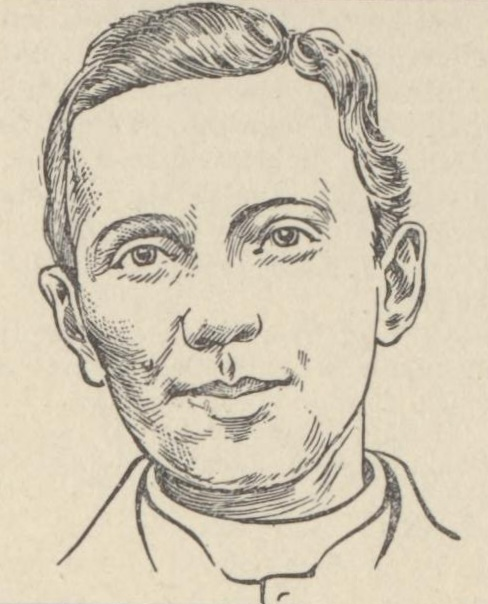
Illustration of Poppe

On 1 May 1916, Poppe was ordained to the priesthood. His motto was "Accendatur" in reference to Luke 12:49. Poppe became the parish associate pastor in Sint-Coleta on 16 June 1916 which was a poor laborers' parish in Ghent. He started the Eucharistic League for the children (he dedicated this to Pope Pius X) and introduced them to the countless aspects of the faith and also taught catechism and handed children devotional cards. He also made it a practice to greet workers after their shifts ended in the late afternoon. Poppe chose to live in material poverty in order to be like his parishioners.

Poppe's manner of living weakened him. In July 1917, he was transferred to a convent in Moerzeke. He was ordered to rest for a month though when he returned the pastor was concerned for him so discharged him from league meetings and catechetical lessons; he obeyed, albeit reluctantly. He was often confined to his bed but from there wrote numerous texts for the "Eucharistische Kruistocht" of Averbode Abbey while often appearing in the popular adolescent magazine Zonneland. In July 1918 he asked the Bishop of Ghent for a different post and so from 4 October 1918 until 1922 he served as the rector to the Vincentian Sisters. Poppe suffered a severe heart attack on 11 May 1919 (and received the Extreme Unction) though spent his time recovering in his bed while writing letters and articles that were criticisms of materialism and Marxism. He suffered a much more serious heart attack on 8 June and could no longer see visitors or celebrate Mass. He recovered over the next several months, making a trip to visit the tomb of Thérèse of Lisieux in France on 15 September 1920.

== Declining health and death ==
Improvement in his health saw him appointed as the spiritual leader of the armed forces school in Leopoldsburg in October 1922 for seminarians and priests drawn into service. But a cardiac crisis in 1923 – while visiting his mother on Christmas – made him unable to return to Leopoldsburg and he again was confined to the Moerzeke convent. He suffered a heart attack on 1 January 1924 but suffered a severe relapse on 3 February. Poppe died from a stroke on the morning of 10 June 1924 as he prepared to dress and take care of affairs. He received the Extreme Unction and gazed at an image of the Sacred Heart of Jesus as he died.

== Post-mortem ==
Cardinal Désiré-Joseph Mercier promoted him as an ideal of a good priest who was spiritual and ascetic and who was prepared to sacrifice his life for the faith. His birth house in Temse has become a museum and the street is renamed "Priester Poppestraat"; another museum can be found in the Moerzeke convent. There are statues of Poppe in both Moerzeke and Ghent.

== Beatification ==
The beatification process opened in Ghent in an informative process that spanned from 21 March 1946 until its closure on 29 September 1952. His cause was formally opened on 6 December 1952, granting him the title of Servant of God. Theologians approved his spiritual writings on 13 February 1959 and 15 January 1971. An apostolic process was held from 18 November 1967 until 25 June 1969. The Congregation for the Causes of Saints (C.C.S.) validated the previous processes in Rome on 28 April 1975 and received the Positio dossier from postulation officials in 1984. The theologians approved the cause on 25 March 1986 as did the C.C.S. on 10 June 1986. The confirmation of his life of heroic virtue on 30 June 1986 allowed for Pope John Paul II to title him as Venerable.

One miracle was required for his beatification which had to be a healing that science could not explain and account for. One such miracle was investigated in the diocese of its origin from 4–19 January 1996 at which stage all documentation was sent to Rome and received C.C.S. validation in a decree on 28 June 1996. Medical experts approved this healing as a miracle on 6 November 1997 as did the theologians on 31 March 1998 and the C.C.S. members on 1 July 1998. John Paul II issued his approval to this miracle on 3 July 1998 and beatified Poppe in Saint Peter's Square on 3 October 1999.

== Sources ==
- Ghesquière, Rita; Quaghebeur, Patricia, eds. (2002). Averbode, een uitgever apart. 1877-2002. Kadoc Artes 6 (in Dutch). Averbode: Universitaire Pers Leuven and Uitgeverij Averbode. pp. 118–119. ISBN 90-5867-232-8.
