= Camille Wauters =

Belgian painter (1856–1919)

- Born: Camille Wauters; 13 November 1856; Temse, Belgium
- Died: 10 September 1919 (aged 62); Lokeren, Belgium
- Education: Académie Julian of Paris
- Occupation: Painter

Camille Wauters (13 November 1856 – 10 September 1919) was a Belgian painter.

== Life and work ==
Camille Wauters was born in Temse, East Flanders, Belgium, on 13 November 1856. He was a landscape painter. Wauters was taught by Ferdinand de Braekeleer the Elder. He studied at the Académie Julian of Paris, where he improved his technique. His talent and studies would have allowed him to reach greater fame, but Wauters avoided exhibitions, wholly living for his art.

He died in Lokeren on 10 September 1919.

== Gallery ==
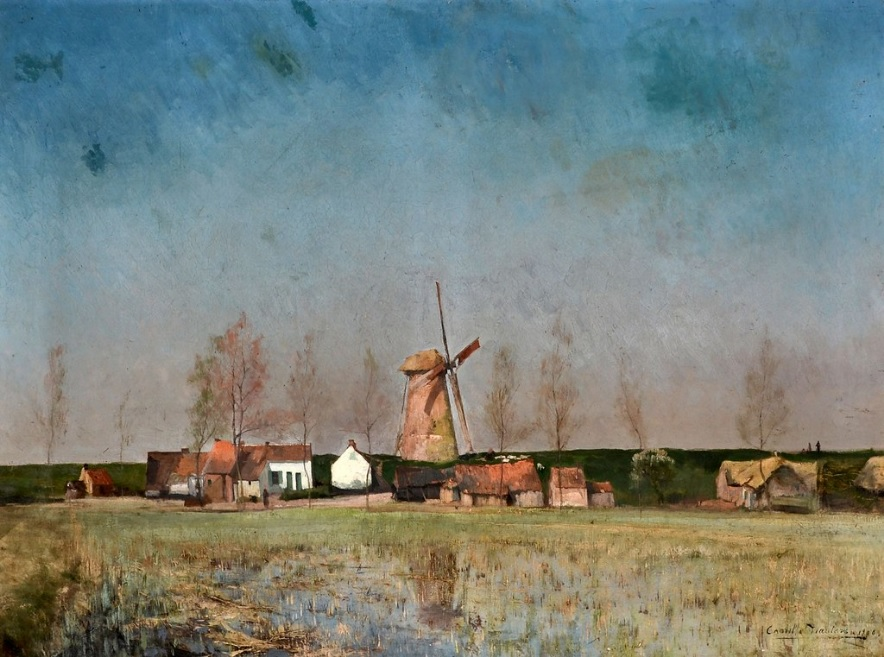
Landschap met molen

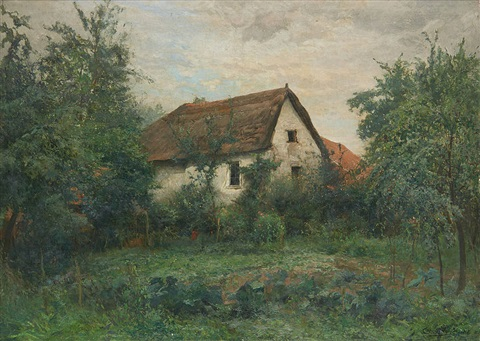
La chaumière vue du potager, 1916

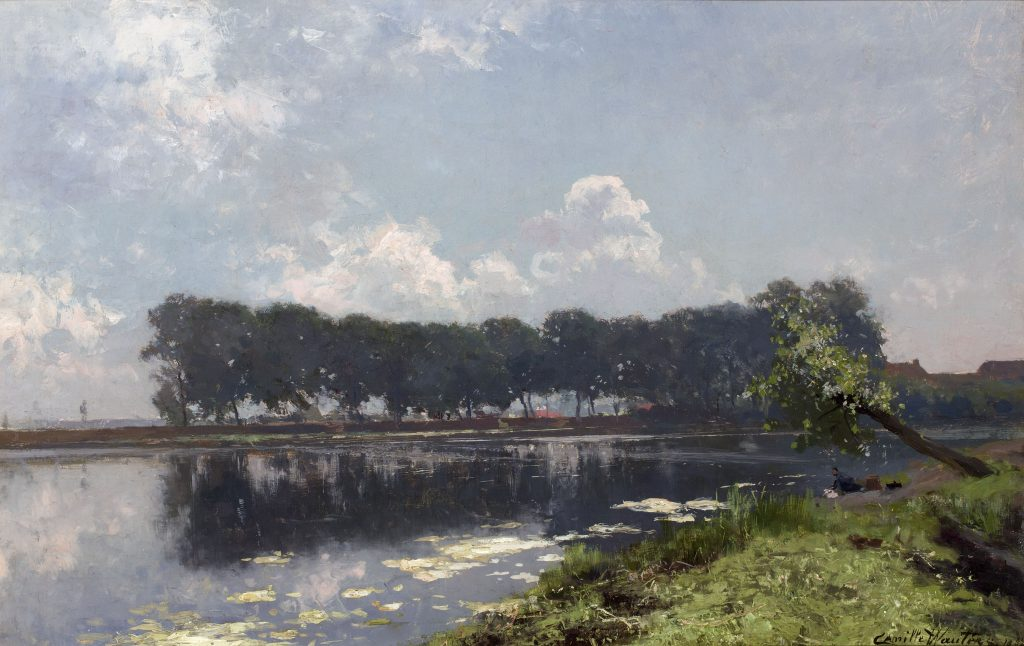
Landscape

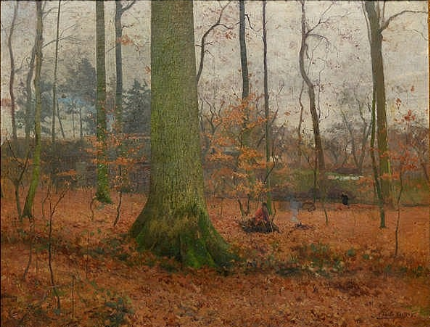
Sous-bois animé en automne
