= Moerzeke =

- Village
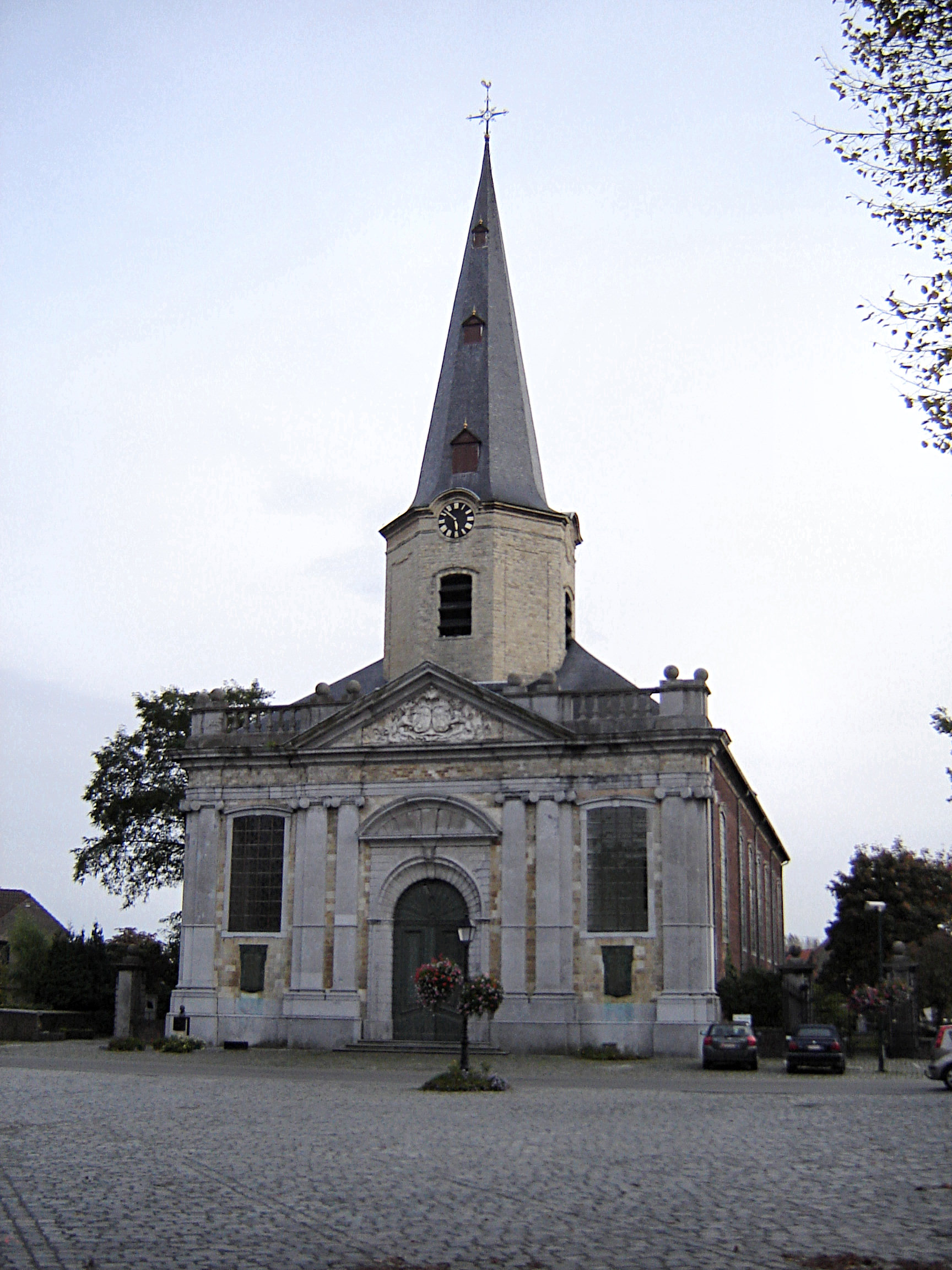
- Saint Martins church of Moerzeke

- Location in Belgium
- Country: Belgium
- Province: East Flanders
- Municipality: Hamme

Area
  - Total: 16.78 km^{2} (6.48 sq mi)

Population (2021)
  - Total: 4,653
  - Density: 277.3/km^{2} (718.2/sq mi)
- Time zone: CET

Moerzeke is a village located at the river Scheldt in the municipality of Hamme, Belgium.

== History ==
The name comes from the Gallo-Roman Mauriciacum, which means good or villa belonging to Mauricius. In the passing ages the name Moerzeke has been written in various ways. In Latin manuscripts from 1125 and 1156 you can read Murzeke and Murceke, in 1171 Morzeka, in 1225 Morsca, in 1259 and 1261 Morseke, in 1330 Mourseka. At the end of the sixteenth century Mercator indicates Moerzeke as Moeshe on his maps. This name is still used by the people of Moerzeke.

The village has a history of disasters. In 1488 the castle of the lord of Moerzeke was ruined by troublemakers from Ghent. The church was plundered too, but the inhabitants of Moerzeke had moved the most valuable pieces of their church to Dendermonde. Reformation brought a lot of mayhem: half the parish got burned down and ravaged and even the church didn't escape this. From 1578 on the Catholic religion was prohibited, violation resulted in the death penalty. In 1580 the Black Death broke out, which nearly killed the total population of Moerzeke. In 1584 after a siege that lasted for 20 days Moerzeke and Dendermonde were liberated from the Protestants by the Spanish troops. In 1590 a priest from Hulst (the Netherlands) came to Moerzeke together with some seventy families from Verrebroek and Kieldrecht to bring the population to a normal level again.

This was not yet the end of misery in Moerzeke however. In 1846-1848 the harvest largely failed, which caused poverty and the death of many. Moerzeke also has had several dam-breaks causing floods.

== Sites ==
Moerzeke holds the burial chapel and associated museum of Father Edward Poppe, who was beatified by Pope John Paul II in 1999. These have grown into places of pilgrimage.

== Gallery ==
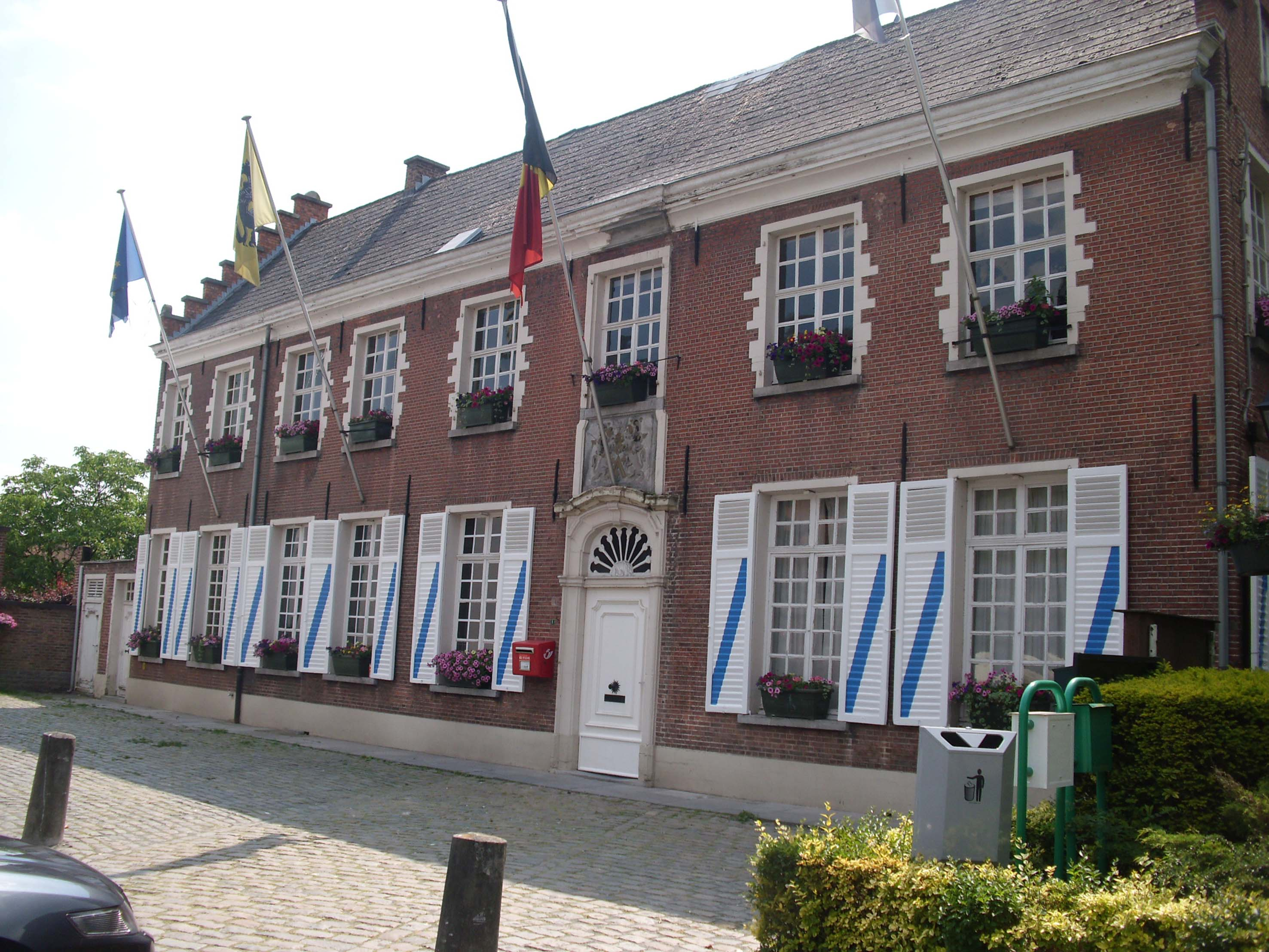
Former town hall

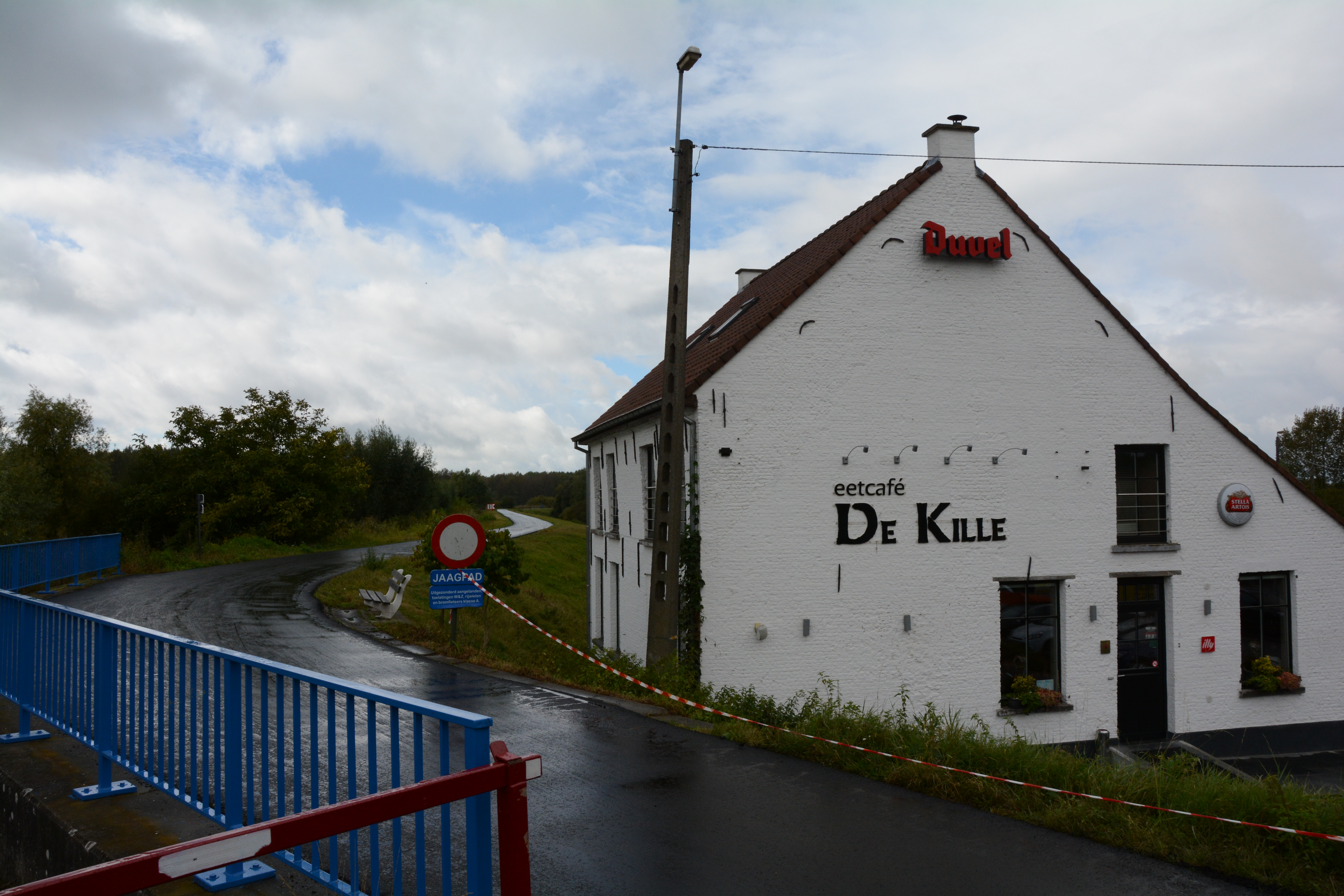
Pub in Moerzeke
