= Nini Bulterijs =

Belgian composer

Nini Bulterijs (also spelled Bulterys) (20 November 1929 – 12 December 1989) was a Belgian composer. She was born in Temse, East Flanders, and studied piano with Jozef d'Hooghe and harmony with Yvonne van den Berghe at the Royal Flemish Conservatory of Antwerp. She continued her studies in composition with Jean Louel privately and with Jean Absil at the Chapelle Musicale Reine Elisabeth.

After completing her studies, she taught at small music schools in Hamme, Vilvoorde and Mechelen before taking a position as professor at the Lemmens Institute at Louvain and in 1970 at the Royal Flemish Conservatoire of Antwerp. She retired from teaching in 1988 and died in Wilrijk.

Bulterijs won second place in the 1963 Prix de Rome contest and in the 1966 Queen Elisabeth International Composition Competition. She received the 1969 Emile Doehaerd Prize.

== Works ==
Bulterijs composed orchestral, chamber ensemble, choral and instrumental works and songs. Selected compositions include:

- Sonata, 2 violins, pianoforte, 1960
- Symphonic Movements, orchestra, 1960
- Pianoforte Concerto, 1961
- Trio for piano, viol and cello, 1962
- Arion (cantata, text: B. Decorte), solo violin, chorus, orchestra, 1963
- Concerto, 2 violin, orchestra, 1964
- Symphony, 1965
- Violin Concerto, 1968
- Rondo, violin, pianoforte, 1972

== Discography ==
- Trio for piano, violin and cello, on LP N. Bulterys – I. Ceulemans – A. Delvaux, Alpha (DBM-V 187), 1973
- Symphony, on LP Hedendaagse Belgische Muziek – Musique Belge Contemporaine, Jacqueline Fontyn – Nini Bulterys, Cultura (5071-5). Performers: Belgian National Orchestra, cond. Daniël Sternefeld
