= Philips Alexander Nijs =

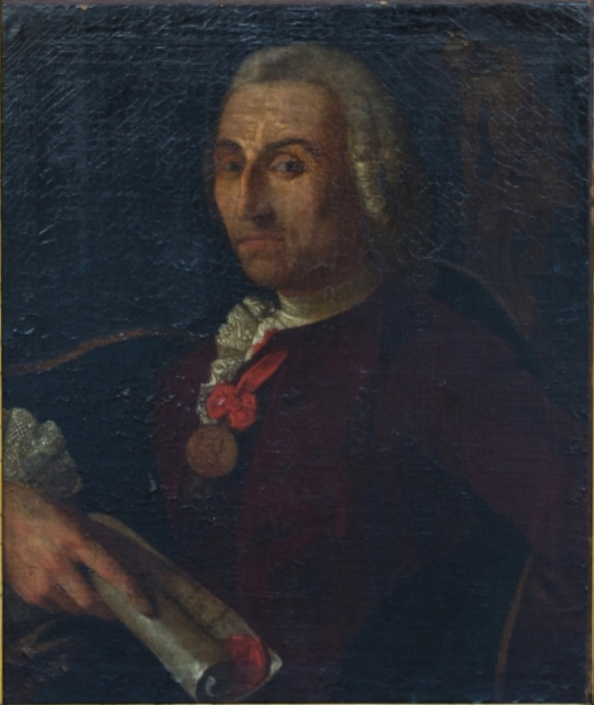
Portrait of Philips Alexander Nijs

Philips Alexander Nijs or Philip Nijs (27 May 1724 – 22 March 1805) was a Flemish sculptor and medalist known for his statues, church furniture and portrait busts. He was the court sculptor of Prince Charles Alexander of Lorraine, the Governor of the Austrian Netherlands, who had his residence in Brussels. He is regarded as an important representative of the Rococo in the Austrian Netherlands.

== Life ==
Philips Alexander Nijs was born in Temse on 27 May 1724. He was one of the 11 children of the sculptor Adriaan Nijs (Egidius Adrianus Nijs) and his father's first wife Joanna Catharina Van der Beke. His parents were from Antwerp but had moved to Temse as there was a lot of work for an experienced sculptor such as the renovation of the interior of the local church. Father Adriaan had trained in Antwerp where he was registered in the local Guild of Saint Luke as a pupil of Andries van den Base in the guild year 1591/92. There is no record of his father becoming a master in the Antwerp Guild. His brothers also became artists or craftsmen: Johannes Franciscus became a silversmith and printmaker, Johannes Baptist a tin and lead founder and Judocus a diamond cutter. His mother died by drowning during a pleasure boat trip on the Scheldt on 15 November 1726 when Philips was only two years old.

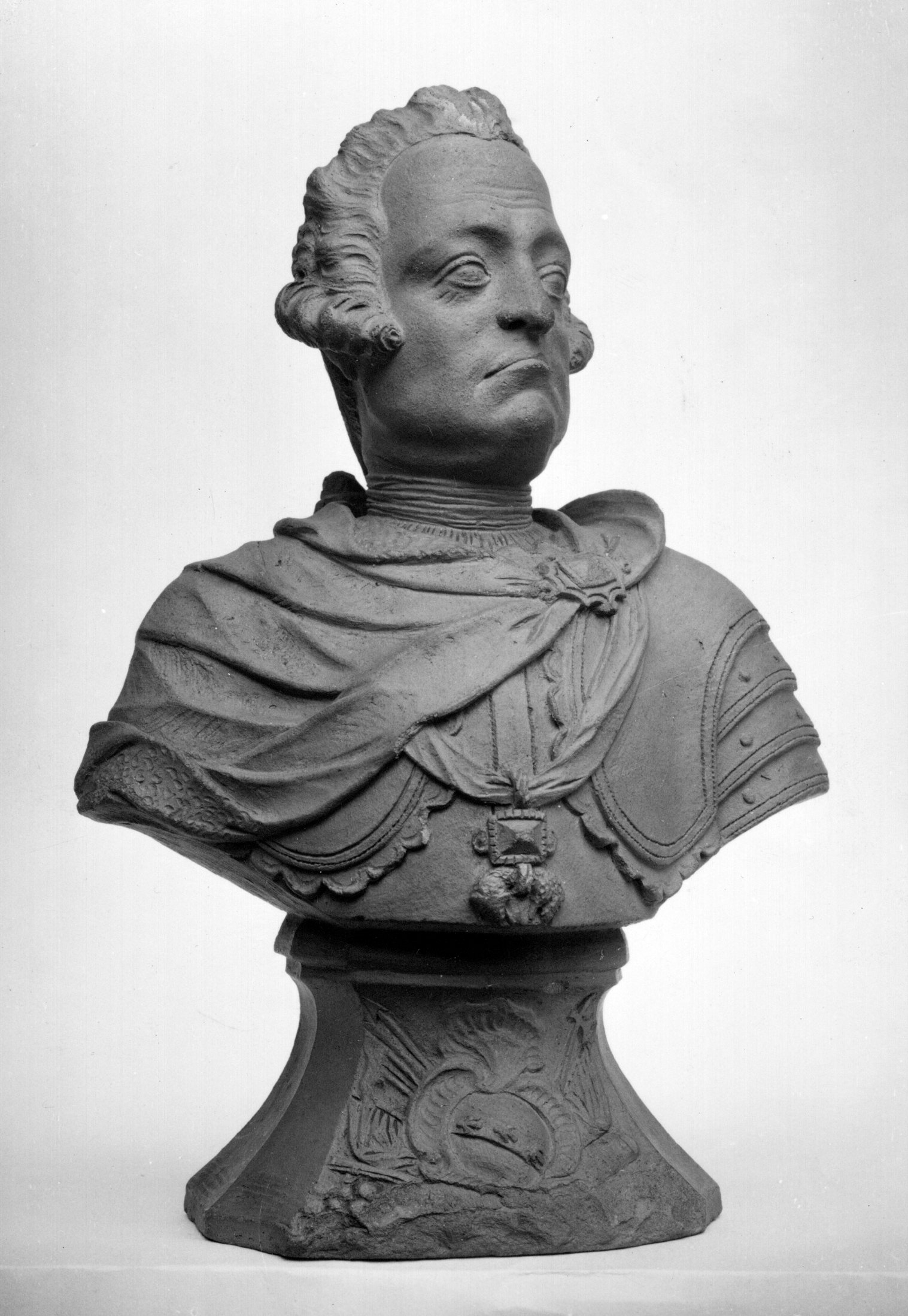
Bust of Prince Charles Alexander of Lorraine, 1755, terracotta, British Museum

Nothing is known about his training but it likely occurred in the workshop of his father. Around 1748 he married Joanna Maria Peeters. The couple had 4 daughters and 7 sons.

When Charles Alexander of Lorraine, the Governor of the Austrian Netherlands, made an official visit to Temse he appointed Philips as his court sculptor. Nijs mentioned this title in his signature and in gilded letters above the door of his residence. He founded an art academy called Academie ofte Teekenconstkamer (Academy or drawing chamber) in his birthplace Temse in 1776.

== Work ==
His known oeuvre is limited. He worked with his father on the church furniture of the Church of Our Lady in Temse. It is not always possible to distinguish between the contributions of father and son. A statue of Saint Peter in the Museum Mayer van den Bergh in Antwerp has been attributed variously to Philips and his father Adriaan. The terracotta statue is a design for a figure of a confessional in Zele.

He created two bust portraits of Charles of Lorraine, in respectively terracotta (the British Museum) and palm wood (King Baudouin Foundation collection, formerly in the collection Maréchal Berthier, Prince de Wagram).
