= Adriaan Nijs =

Flemish sculptor (1683–1771)

Shrine of Saint-James, Kemzeke

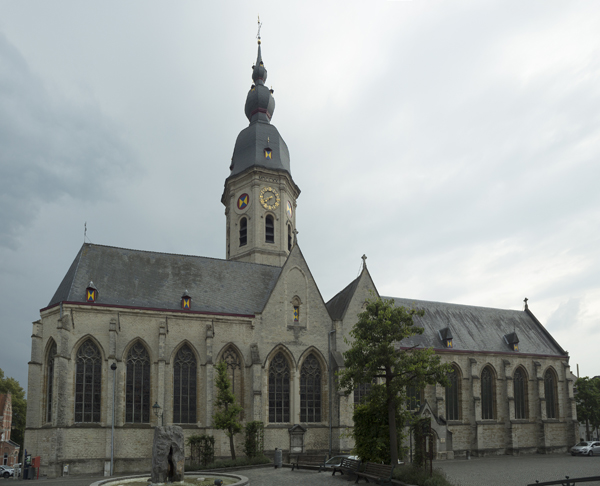
The Church of Our Lady in Temse, with the spire by Adriaan Nijs

Adriaan Nijs (6 June 1683 – 21 April 1771) was a Flemish sculptor active in the Waasland.

He was educated in Antwerp, where he was a pupil of Hendrik Frans Verbruggen. At the end of his life he settled in Temse. His oeuvre is known for its pure Rococo carvings.

He married Joanna Catharina Van der Beke, by whom he had two daughters and nine sons. One of his sons from this marriage, Philips Alexander, was also a sculptor and his son Frans a well-known goldsmith. He later remarried to Catharina Magdalena Wesemael.

He died in Temse in 1771.

== Known works ==
- Collegekapel Sint-Niklaas: choir stalls
- Sint-Ludgeruskerk, Zele: confessionals, communion rail
- Sint-Petruskerk, Bazel: communion rail
- Church of Our Lady, Temse: spire, communion rails, pulpit, confessionals and choir stalls
- Sint-Niklaaskerk, Lochristi: communion rail and panelling
- Buggenhout, Sint-Niklaaskerk: pulpit
- Gruuthusemuseum, Brugge: sculptures

== Gallery ==
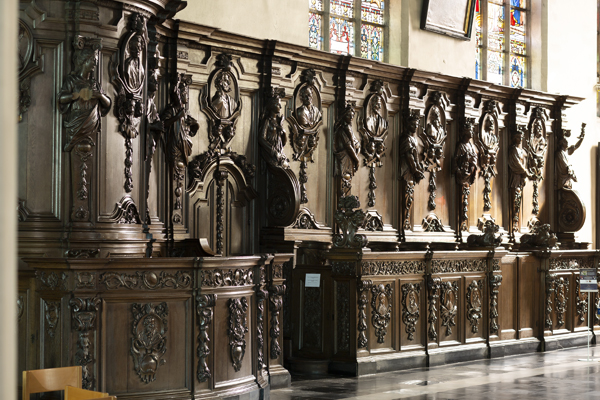
Seating of the choir of the Church of Our Lady in Temse

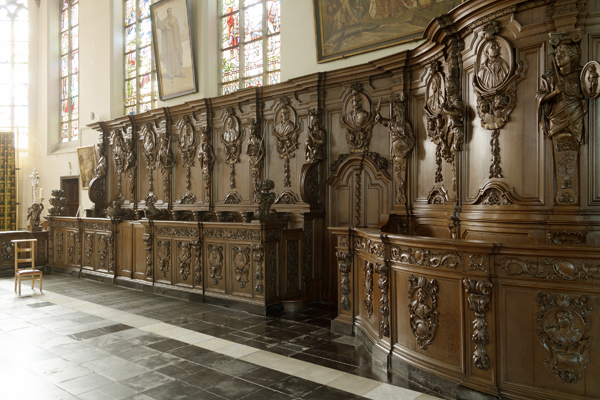
Choir seats, Church of Our Lady, Temse
