= Jan Van Landeghem =

Jan Van Landeghem (born 28 November 1954) is a Belgian composer, musicologist, organist, harpsichordist and conductor.

He was born in 1954 in Temse. Van Landeghem studied at the conservatories of Maastricht and Brussels. He studied under André Laporte with Luc Brewaeys and Peter Swinnen. His teacher followed recent developments of international music, and some of his students absorbed "the whole spectrum", from spectralism to electronic music. Van Landeghem, however, was more selective.

As a composer he wrote more than 200 works. Van Landeghem won 15 national and international prizes for his compositions, including the Horlait–Dapsens Prize at the Conservatory of Brussels and the Wendungen Prize at the Festival of Flanders. He is currently a professor at the Royal Flemish Conservatory of Brussels and the director of the Academy of Music of Bornem. He was chosen as a member of the board of SABAM.
