= Antoine Chevrier =

French Catholic priest

Blessed Antoine Chevrier TOSF
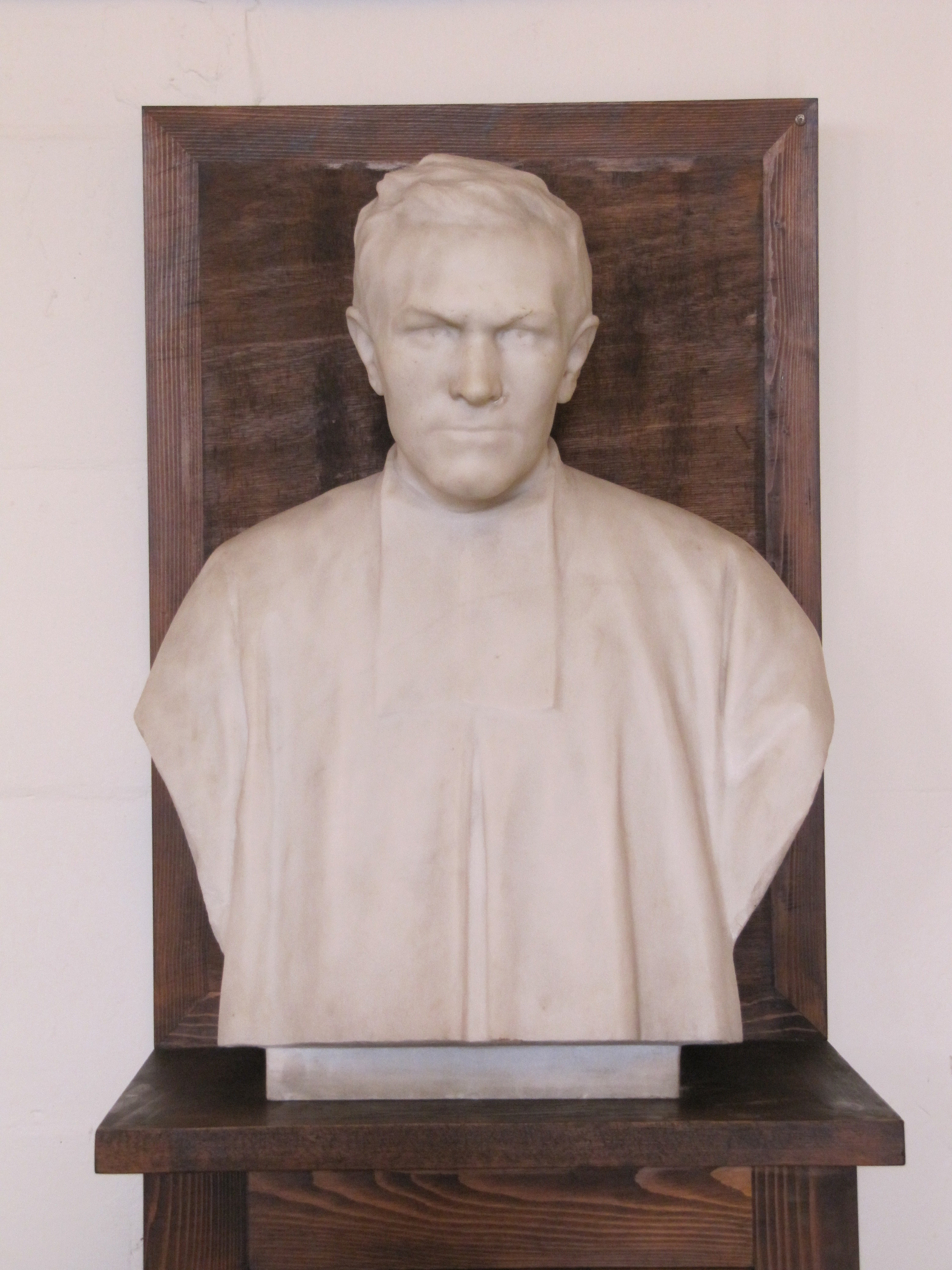
- Bust.
- Born: 16 April 1825; Lyon, Rhône, Kingdom of France
- Died: 2 October 1879 (aged 54); Lyon, Rhône, French Third Republic
- Venerated in: Roman Catholic Church
- Beatified: 4 October 1986, Lyon, France by Pope John Paul II
- Feast: 2 October

Antoine Chevrier, TOSF (16 April 1825 – 2 October 1879) was a French Catholic priest and a member of the Third Order of Saint Francis. He founded the Institute of the Prado with its two branches: the Sisters of Prado and the Institute of the Priests of Prado. His entire life and pastoral mission was devoted to the service of the poor and the education of poor children and those on the peripheries.

He was beatified on 4 October 1986 during Pope John Paul II's visit to France.

== Life ==
Antoine Chevrier was born on Easter on 16 April 1825. He was the sole child born to his parents and received baptism on the following 18 April. From his father he inherited a humble spirit and gentleness while he received from his mother a passionate and energetic disposition. He had his First Communion in 1837.

In 1840 - at the age of fourteen - a parish priest asked him if he wanted to become a priest himself. Chevrier never thought about it but said he would like to. He felt immediate happiness in this realization and decided to become a priest. Chevrier commenced his studies for the priesthood at the age of seventeen in 1842. He received the cassock in October 1846 and received the tonsure in 1847.

Prior to his being made a priest he wanted to join the foreign missions but his mother opposed and said to him: "You are an ingrate, mister, a bad son. Do you think I raised you for you to be eaten by savages? Savages you can fin in Lyon! If you go in spite of me, I will disown you as my child". He was ordained to the priesthood on 25 May 1850 from Cardinal Louis Jacques Maurice de Bonald and was sent to Saint-André de la Guillotière as an assistant priest where he became obsessed with the miserable conditions of the poor that he encountered. On suffering he wrote: "Do you know what makes men? Suffering, hardships, mortifications. The man who has not suffered knows nothing - he is a limp noodle".

In a sermon - on the issue of the poor - he said: "as long as the great ones of the earth enrich themselves, as long as the world's wealth remains locked in the greedy hands of the few who search for it, so long will poverty increase, work opportunities decrease and salaries remain unpaid. We see poor workers laboring from the dawn of the day far into the night, hardly earning enough for their bread and that of their children".

In the middle of the night on 31 May 1856 a great storm caused flooding. He rescued several victims despite the danger to his own life. On Christmas Eve in 1856 he meditated before the crib and it was there and then that he realized his true mission as a priest was to evangelize to the poor but also to tend to the poor on the streets while forming a religious congregation for all those who were poor. This experience was almost like a sudden "conversion". In Ars-sur-Formans - in January 1857 - he consulted with John-Baptiste-Marie Vianney on his mission and who encouraged his work. He asked to leave his parish to pursue this aim and a meeting with the layman Camille Rambaud in June 1857 hastened this. Sometimes parents sent him their delinquent children and others asked him to get their children out of prison and take them to live with him for a better life.

In 1859 he became a professed member of the Third Order of Saint Francis. On 10 December 1860 he purchased a disused ballroom in order to establish a chapel and a shelter for poor children and those on the peripheries in order to provide them with a Christian education. In his lifetime he received around 2400 male adolescents. In 1866 he opened a clerical school - that grew into his male institute - for clerical aspirants. The first lot were ordained in Rome in 1876. The female branch of his order - the Sisters of Prado - opened not long after his first was established. Social unrest threatened Lyon and Paris in 1871 but the conflict in Lyon stalled as Chevrier celebrated the Feast of Corpus Christi and paraded the Eucharist through the streets; the quarrelers dared not interrupt the celebration.

Chevrier was also a writer and he wrote both the Disciple of Jesus Christ and God sends Revolutions. The latter was a critique of priests who pursued greed and their excessive attachment to material goods.

He fell ill in the spring of 1874 which began his long period of illness until his death. He recovered and made a four-month visit to Rome to be with his future priests. But one left to become a member of the Trappists while the others - who were ordained in May 1877 - were reluctant to return with Chevrier to the congregation.

He knew his death was approaching in September 1879 due to his ailment. Chevrier died on 2 October 1879 after suffering a long illness. Around 10000 people attended his funeral. His order was approved of diocesan right in 1924 and was aggregated to the Conventual Franciscans in 1930. The order received the papal decree of praise of Pope John XXIII on 28 October 1959.

== Beatification ==
The beatification process commenced once a diocesan investigation commenced into his life. Its closure allowed for theologians to compile all of his written works and assess whether or not such writings adhered to the official magisterium of the Roman Catholic Church - these were cleared and approved on 11 January 1911.

The formal introduction to the cause did not come until 11 June 1913 under Pope Pius X. This granted Chevrier the title of Servant of God - the first stage in the process.

The second process opened and continued the work of the first following the introduction of the cause. Both processes received formal ratification from the Congregation of Rites on 19 November 1930 which would allow for Roman officials to begin their own investigation into Chevrier's cause.

On 16 January 1953 he was proclaimed to be Venerable after Pope Pius XII recognized that Chevrier had lived a model Christian life of heroic virtue.

The process on a miracle commenced in its diocese of origin and after closure was validated on 11 November 1930. Pope John Paul II approved it and beatified Chevrier on his visit to France on 4 October 1986.
