= Landingham =

Landingham may refer to:

- Marian Van Landingham (born 1937), American community leader, politician and artist
- Mrs. Landingham, fictional Secretary to the President of the United States in the first two seasons of The West Wing
- J. C. Van Landingham (c. 1918–1996), American stock car racing driver
- William Van Landingham (born 1970), former pitcher in Major League Baseball
