= Peter Paul Rubens =

Flemish artist and diplomat (1577–1640)

Sir Peter Paul Rubens
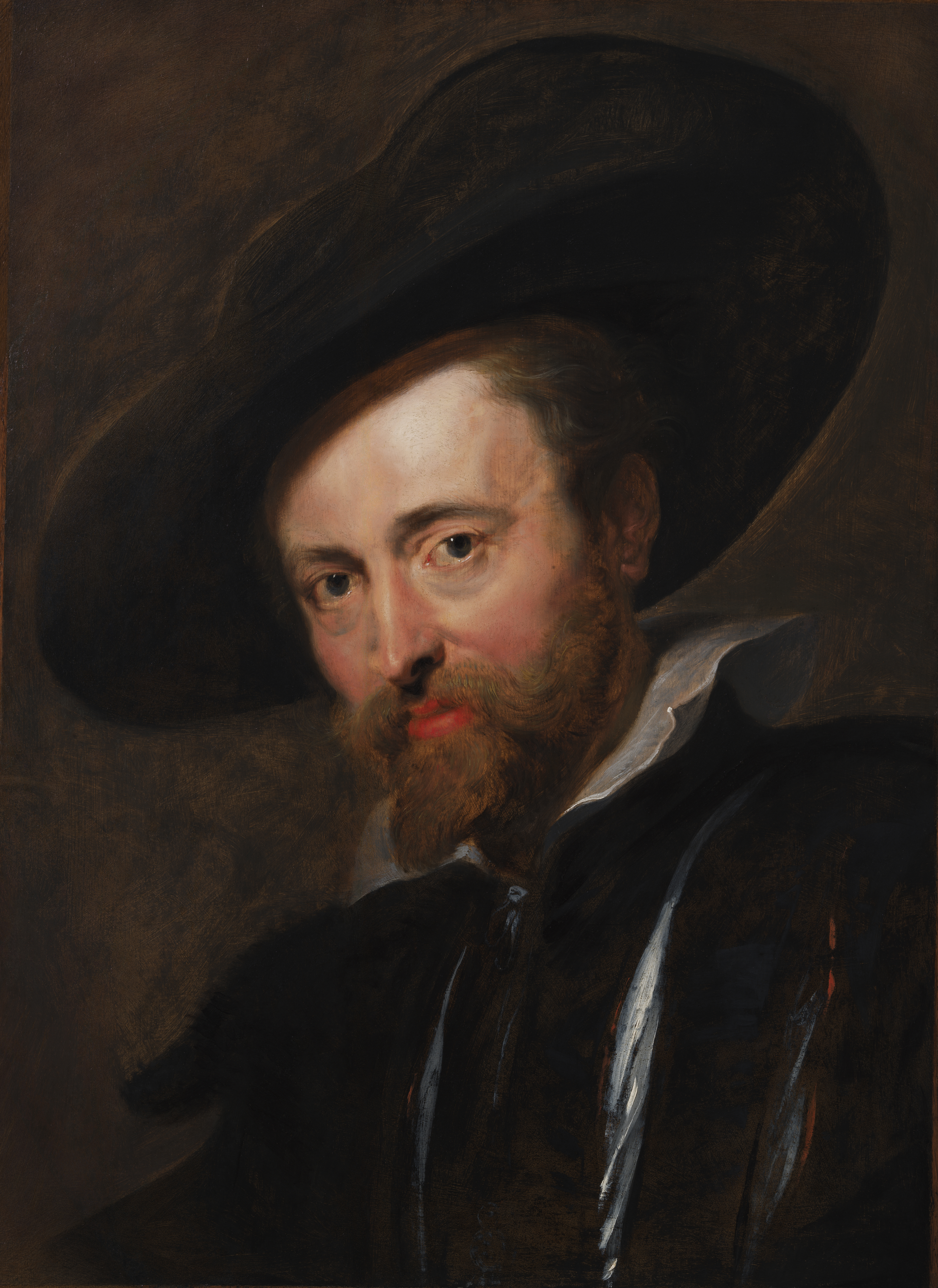
- Self-Portrait, c. 1623 – c. 1630
- Born: 28 June 1577; Siegen, Nassau-Dillenburg, Holy Roman Empire
- Died: 30 May 1640 (aged 62); Antwerp, Spanish Netherlands
- Education: Tobias Verhaecht; Adam van Noort; Otto van Veen
- Known for: Painting, drawing, tapestry design, print design
- Movement: Flemish Baroque
- Spouses: Isabella Brant (m. 1609; died 1626) Helena Fourment (m. 1630)
- Children: 8, including Nikolaas and Albert
- Parents: Jan Rubens; Maria Pypelincks

Sir Peter Paul Rubens (/ˈruːbənz/ ROO-bənz; Dutch: [ˈpeːtər pʌul ˈrybəns]; 28 June 1577 – 30 May 1640) was a Flemish artist and diplomat. He is considered the most influential artist of the Flemish Baroque tradition. Rubens's highly charged compositions reference erudite aspects of classical and Christian history. His unique and immensely popular Baroque style emphasised movement, colour, and sensuality, which followed the immediate, dramatic artistic style promoted in the Counter-Reformation. Rubens was a painter producing altarpieces, portraits, landscapes, and history paintings of mythological and allegorical subjects. He was also a prolific designer of cartoons for the Flemish tapestry workshops and of frontispieces for the publishers in Antwerp.

Rubens was born and raised in the Holy Roman Empire (modern-day Germany) to parents who were refugees from Antwerp in the Duchy of Brabant in the Spanish Netherlands and moved to Antwerp at about 12. In addition to running a large workshop in Antwerp that produced paintings popular with nobility and art collectors throughout Europe, Rubens was a classically educated humanist scholar and diplomat who was knighted by both Philip IV of Spain and Charles I of England. Rubens was a prolific artist. The catalogue of his works by Michael Jaffé lists 1,403 pieces, excluding numerous copies made in his workshop.

His commissioned works were mostly history paintings, which included religious and mythological subjects, and hunt scenes. He painted portraits, especially of friends, and self-portraits, and in later life painted several landscapes. Rubens designed tapestries and prints, as well as his own house. He also oversaw the ephemeral decorations of the royal entry into Antwerp by the Cardinal-Infante Ferdinand of Austria in 1635. He wrote a book with illustrations of the palaces in Genoa, which was published in 1622 as Palazzi di Genova. The book was influential in spreading the Genoese palace style in Northern Europe. Rubens was an avid art collector and had one of the largest collections of art and books in Antwerp. He was also an art dealer and is known to have sold important art objects to George Villiers, 1st Duke of Buckingham.

He was one of the last major artists to make consistent use of wooden panels as a support medium, even for very large works, but used canvas as well, especially when the work needed to be sent a long distance. For altarpieces, he sometimes painted on slate to reduce reflection problems.

== Life ==
=== Early life ===
Peter Paul Rubens was born on 28 June 1577 in Siegen, Nassau, to Jan Rubens and Maria Pypelincks. His father's family were long-time residents of Antwerp, tracing their lineage there back to 1350. Records show that a certain Arnold Rubens bought 'a house with court' in the Gasthuisstraat in Antwerp in 1396. The Rubens family belonged to the well-to-do bourgeois class, and its members were known to operate grocery shops and pharmacies.

Jan Rubens studied law and lived from 1556 to 1562 in the main cities of Italy to further his studies. He was awarded the degree of doctor of ecclesiastical and civil law by the Sapienza University in Rome. Upon his return to Antwerp, he became a lawyer and held the office of alderman in Antwerp from 1562 to 1568. Jan Rubens married Maria Pypelincks, who came from a prominent family originally from Kuringen, near Hasselt.

A large portion of the nobility and bourgeoisie in the Spanish Netherlands at the time sided with the Reformation and Jan Rubens also converted to Calvinism. In 1566 the Low Countries were the victim of the iconoclastic fury, referred to in Dutch as the Beeldenstorm (pronounced [ˈbeːldə(n)ˌstɔr(ə)m]) during which Catholic art and many forms of church fittings and decoration were destroyed in unofficial or mob actions by Calvinist Protestant crowds as part of the Protestant Reformation. The ruler of the Low Countries—the Catholic Spanish king Philip II—reacted to the unrest by ordering the severe repression of the followers of the Reformation. In 1568, the Rubens family, with two boys and two girls (Jan Baptist (1562–1600), Blandina (1564–1606), Clara (1565–1580) and Hendrik (1567–1583)), fled to Cologne. As Calvinists, they feared persecution in their homeland during the harsh rule of the Duke of Alba, who, as the Governor of the Spanish Netherlands, was responsible for implementing the harsh repression.

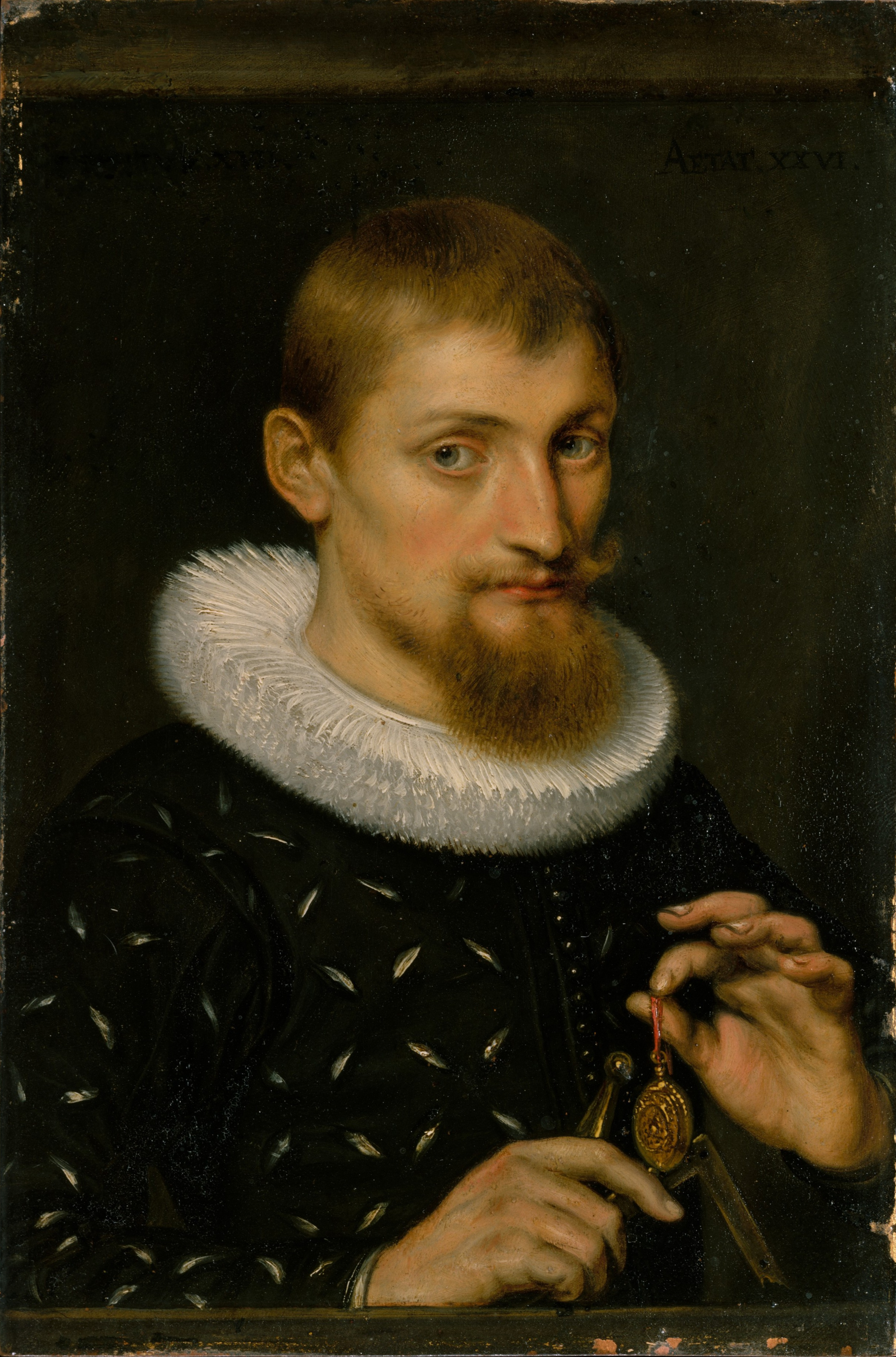
Portrait of a Man, Possibly an Architect or Geographer, 1597

Jan Rubens became in 1570 the legal adviser of Anna of Saxony, the second wife of William I of Orange who at the time lived in Cologne. She later moved to Siegen about 90 kilometres from Cologne. Jan Rubens would visit her there while his family remained in Cologne. He and Anna of Saxony had an affair, which resulted in a pregnancy in 1571. Rubens was imprisoned in Dillenburg Castle and faced the threat of execution for his transgression. The adulterers' daughter, Christina of Dietz, was born on 22 August 1571.

Upon the repeated pleas of his wife and the payment of a bail bond of 6,000 thalers, Jan Rubens was permitted to leave prison after two years. The conditions of his release were a ban on practising as a lawyer and the obligation to take up residence in Siegen where his movements would be supervised. This put the rest of the family, who had joined Jan in Siegen, in financial difficulty. During this period two sons were born: Philip in 1574, followed in 1577 by Peter Paul who, although likely born in Siegen, was reportedly baptised in Cologne. Anna of Saxony died in 1577. The travel ban imposed on Jan Rubens was lifted in 1578 on condition that he not settle in the Prince of Orange's possessions nor in the hereditary dominions of the Low Countries and maintain the bail bond of 6,000 thalers as security. He was allowed to leave his place of exile in Siegen and to move the Rubens family to Cologne. While in Siegen, the family had of necessity belonged to the Lutheran Church in Cologne. The family now reconverted to Catholicism. The eldest son, Jan Baptist, who may also have been an artist, left for Italy in 1586. Jan Rubens died in 1587 and was buried in Cologne's St. Peter's Church, a Catholic church. In 1590 the widowed Maria Pypelinckx returned with the rest of the family (i.e. Blandina, Philip and Peter Paul) to Antwerp, where they moved into a house on the Kloosterstraat.

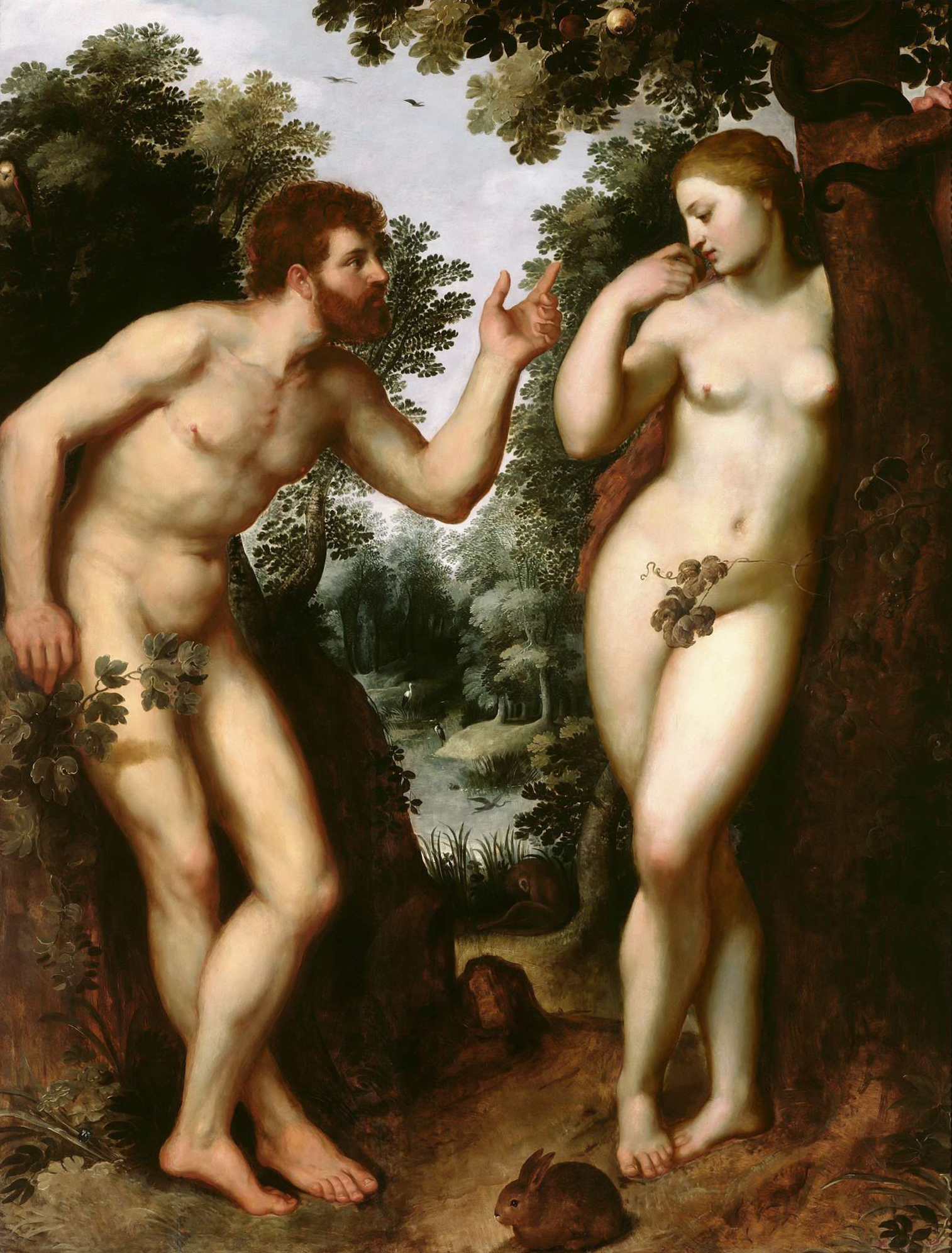
Adam and Eve, early work, c. 1599

=== Apprenticeship ===
Until his death in 1587, Jan Rubens had been intensively involved in his sons' education. Peter Paul and his older brother Philip received a humanist education in Cologne which they continued after their move to Antwerp. They were enrolled at the Latin school of Rombout (Romuldus) Verdonck in Antwerp, where they studied Latin and classical literature. Philip later became a prominent antiquarian, librarian and philologist but died young. One of Peter Paul's schoolmates was Balthasar Moretus, the grandson of Christophe Plantin, the founder of the large Plantin-Moretus publishing house in Antwerp. Balthasar would be a lifelong friend and become the head of his family's publishing house. In 1590, the brothers had to interrupt their schooling and start working, in order to contribute financially to their sister Blandina's dowry.

While his brother Philip would continue with his humanistic and scholarly education while working as a private teacher, Peter Paul first took up a position as a page to the Countess Marguerite de Ligne-Arenberg, whose father-in-law had been the governor general of the Spanish Netherlands. The countess was the widow of Count Philippe de Lalaing and probably lived in Oudenaarde. Even though intellectually and temperamentally suited for a career as a courtier, Rubens had from a young age been attracted by the woodblock prints of Hans Holbein the Younger and Tobias Stimmer, which he had diligently copied, along with Marcantonio Raimondi's engravings after Raphael. Acting on his ambition to pursue a career as an artist, he began an apprenticeship with the landscape painter Tobias Verhaecht in 1592. Verhaecht was married to Suzanna van Mockenborch, who was a granddaughter of Peter Paul Rubens's stepfather Jan de Landmetere and also a cousin of his mother. This family connection possibly explains the choice for Verhaecht as his first master.

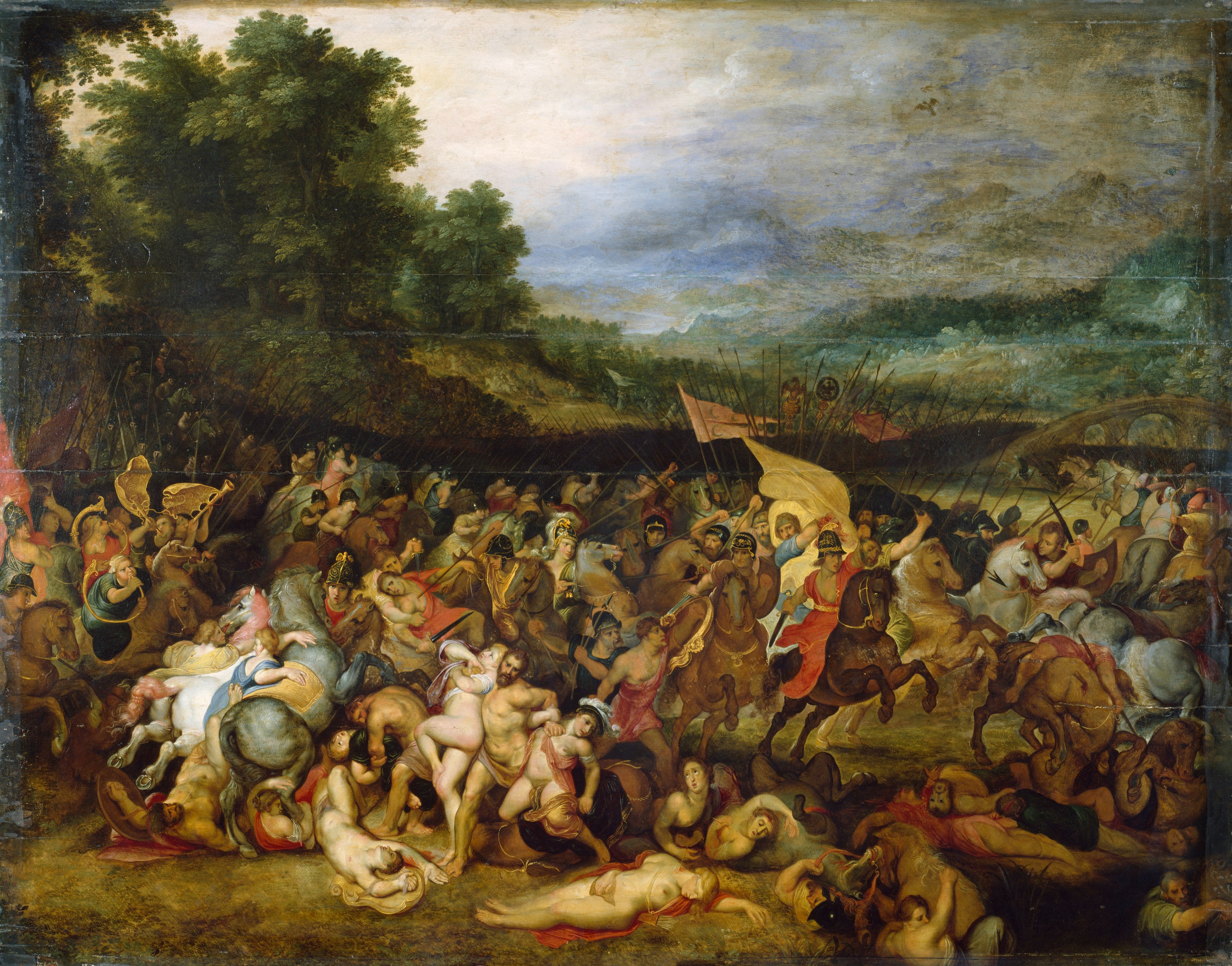
Battle of the Amazons, 1598

Rubens left Verhaecht's workshop after about one year as he wished to study history painting rather than landscape painting. He then continued his studies with one of the city's leading painters of the time, the artist Adam van Noort. Van Noort was a so-called Romanist, a term used to denote artists who had travelled from the Low Countries to Rome to study the work of leading Italian artists of the period such as Michelangelo, Leonardo da Vinci, Raphael and Titian and had created upon their return home artworks that reflected their engagement with these Italian innovations. Rubens's apprenticeship with van Noort lasted about four years during which he improved his handling of figures and faces.

He subsequently studied with another Romanist painter, Otto van Veen. Van Veen offered Rubens the intellectual and artistic stimulation that suited his temperament. Van Veen had spent five years in Italy and was an accomplished portraitist and had a broad Humanist education. He knew Spanish royalty and had received portrait commissions as a court painter to Albert VII, Archduke of Austria and Infanta Isabella Clara Eugenia of Spain, the sovereigns of the Spanish Netherlands. Van Veen instilled in Rubens the ideal of the 'pictor doctus' (learned painter), who understands that painting requires not only practice, but also a knowledge of art theory, Classical art and literature, and the masters of the Italian Renaissance. He also introduced Rubens to the 'code of conduct' which court painters needed to respect to become successful. Rubens completed his apprenticeship with van Veen in 1598, the year he entered the Guild of St. Luke as an independent master. As an independent master, he was allowed to take commissions and train apprentices. His first pupil was Deodat del Monte who would later accompany him on his trip to Italy. He seems to have remained an assistant in van Veen's studio after becoming an independent master. His works from this period, such as the Adam and Eve (Rubenshuis, Antwerp, c. 1599) and the Battle of the Amazons (Sanssouci Picture Gallery, Potsdam) show the influence of his master van Veen. This style was characterised by a pronounced Italianate mannerism constrained by the Antwerp workshop tradition and the Italian art theory of the Renaissance.

=== Italy (1600–1608) ===
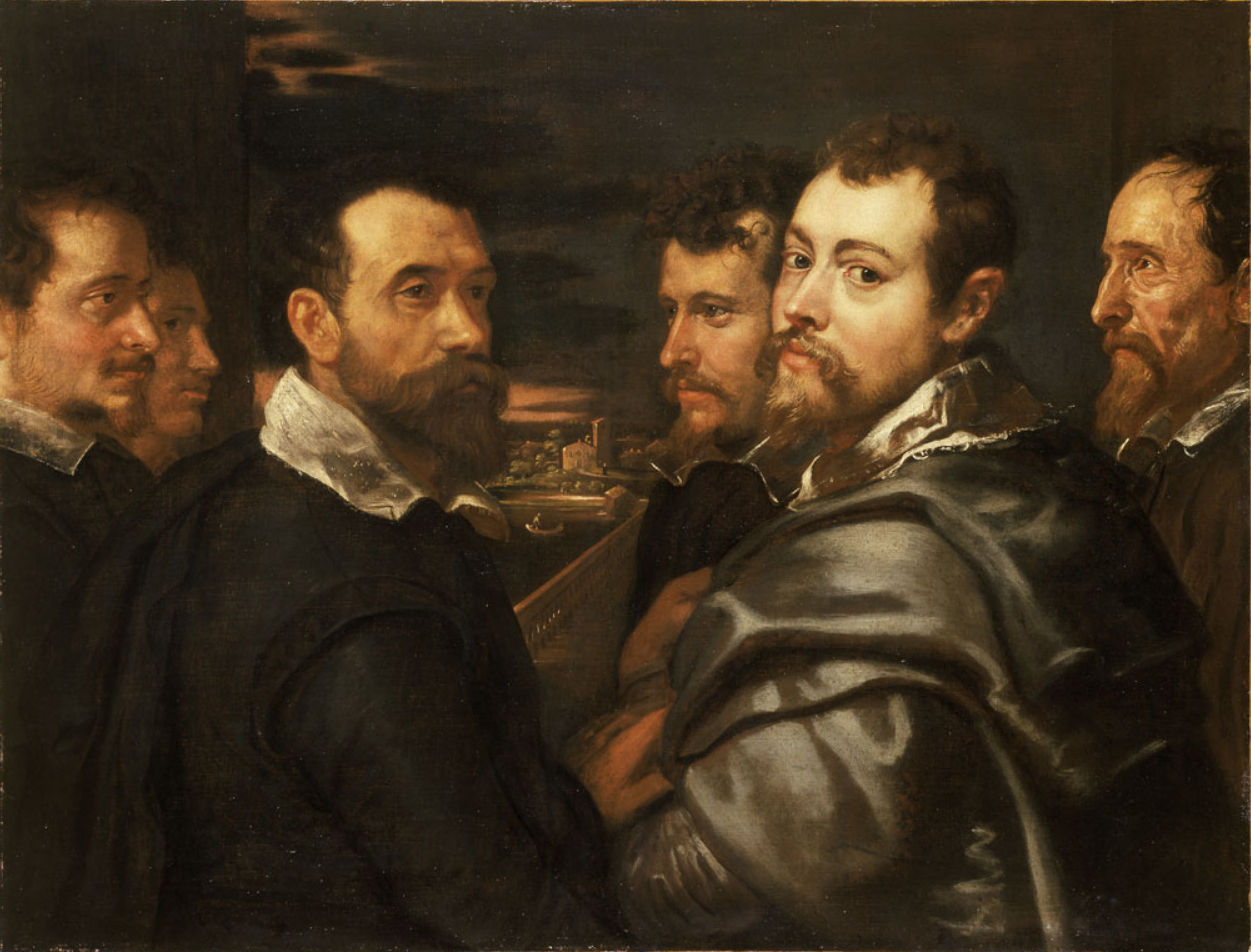
Self-Portrait in a Circle of Friends from Mantua, 1602–06

In 1600 Rubens travelled to Italy with his first pupil Deodat del Monte. They stopped first in Venice, where he saw paintings by Titian, Veronese, and Tintoretto. The colouring and compositions of Veronese and Tintoretto had an immediate effect on Rubens's painting, and his later, mature style was profoundly influenced by Titian. His visit to Venice coincided with that of Duke Vincenzo I Gonzaga of Mantua. It is possible that he was hired by the Duke during his stay in Venice or that Otto van Veen, who was court painter to Archdukes Albert and Isabella, joint governors of the Spanish Netherlands, had introduced Rubens to the Duke during the latter's visit to the Brussels court. The small Duchy of Mantua was renowned as an art centre and the Duke as an avid art collector with a rich collection of Italian masters. Rubens mainly painted portraits of the Duke's family and also copied the famous Renaissance paintings in the Duke's collection. With financial support from the Duke, Rubens travelled to Rome by way of Florence in 1601. There, he studied classical Greek and Roman art and copied works of the Italian masters. The Hellenistic sculpture Laocoön and His Sons was especially influential on him, as was the art of Michelangelo, Raphael and Leonardo.

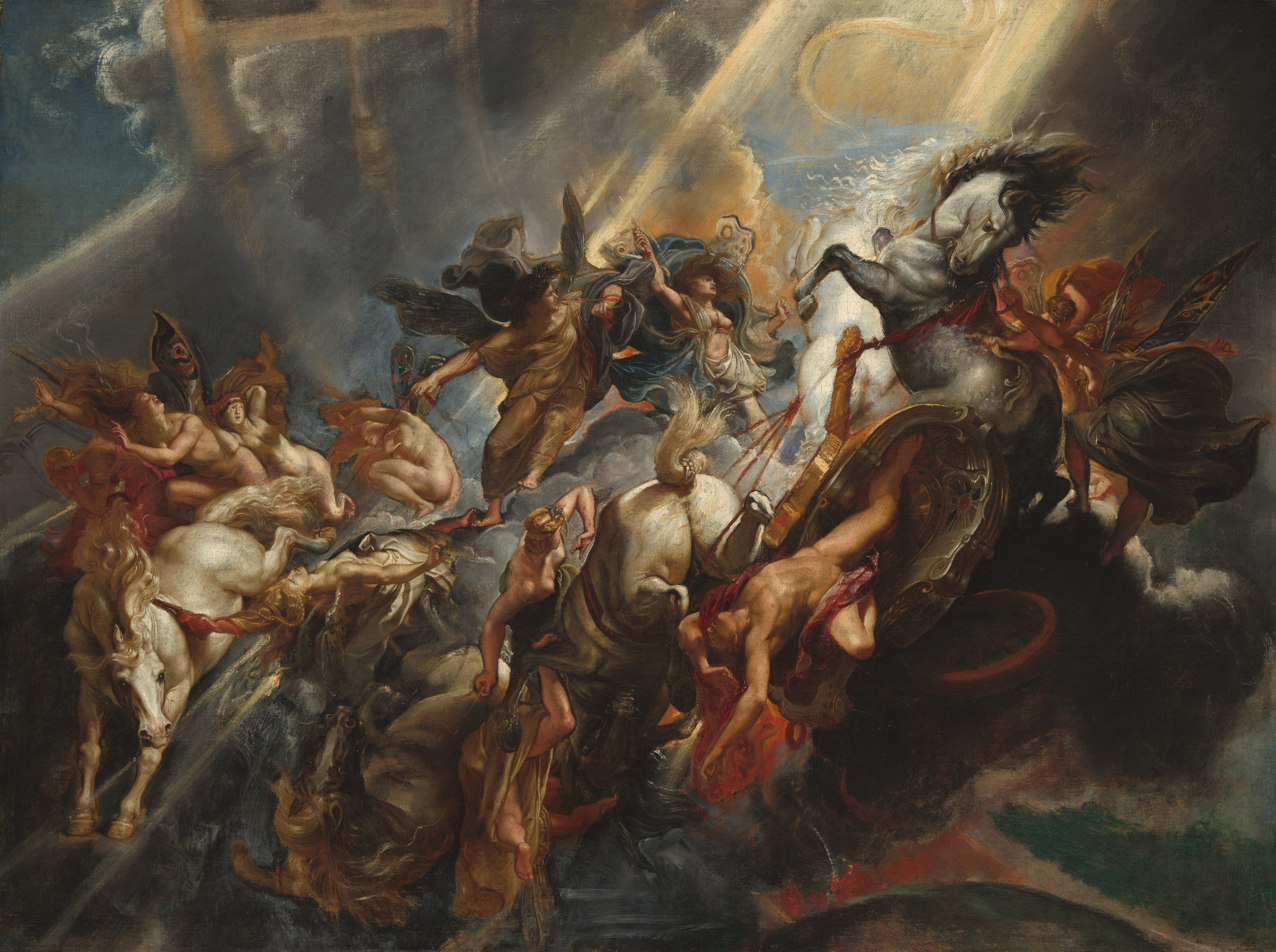
The Fall of Phaeton, c. 1604/1605, probably reworked c. 1606/1608, National Gallery of Art Washington

Rubens came in Rome also under the spell of the recent, highly naturalistic paintings by Caravaggio. He later made a copy of Caravaggio's Entombment of Christ and recommended his patron, the Duke of Mantua, to buy The Death of the Virgin (Louvre). He remained a strong supporter of Caravaggio's art as shown by his important role in the acquisition of The Madonna of the Rosary (Kunsthistorisches Museum, Vienna) for St. Paul's Church, Antwerp after he had returned home. During this first stay in Rome, Rubens completed his first altarpiece commission, St. Helena with the True Cross for the Roman church of Santa Croce in Gerusalemme.

Rubens travelled to Spain on a diplomatic mission in 1603, delivering gifts from the Gonzagas to the court of Philip III of Spain. While there, he studied the extensive collections of Raphael and Titian that had been collected by Philip II. He also painted an equestrian portrait of the Duke of Lerma during his stay (Prado, Madrid) that demonstrates the influence of works like Titian's Charles V at Mühlberg (1548; Museo del Prado, Madrid). This journey marked the first of many during his career that combined art and diplomacy.

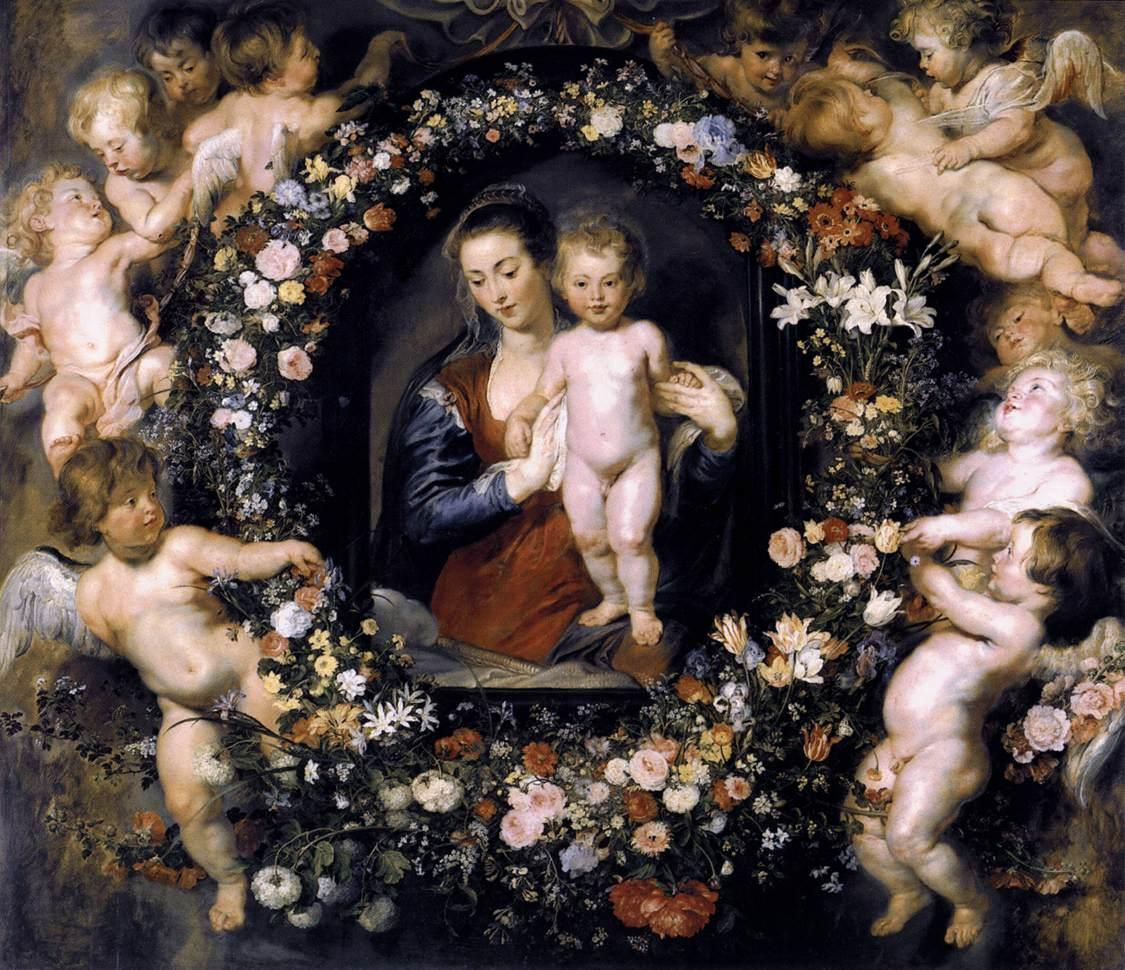
Madonna on Floral Wreath, together with Jan Brueghel the Elder, 1619

He returned to Italy in 1604, where he remained for the next four years, first in Mantua and then in Genoa. In Genoa, Rubens painted numerous portraits, such as the Marchesa Brigida Spinola-Doria (National Gallery of Art Washington), and the portrait of Maria di Antonio Serra Pallavicini, in a style that influenced later paintings by Anthony van Dyck, Joshua Reynolds and Thomas Gainsborough. He made drawings of the many new palaces that were going up in Genoa. These were later engraved and published in 1622 as Palazzi di Genova.

From 1606 to 1608, he was mostly in Rome when he received, with the assistance of Cardinal Jacopo Serra (the brother of Maria Pallavicini), his most important commission to date for the High Altar of the city's most fashionable new church, Santa Maria in Vallicella also known as the Chiesa Nuova. The subject was St. Gregory the Great and important local saints adoring an icon of the Virgin and Child. The first version, a single canvas (now at the Museum of Grenoble), was immediately replaced by a second version on three slate panels that permits the actual miraculous holy image of the "Santa Maria in Vallicella" to be revealed on important feast days by a removable copper cover, also painted by the artist. His brother Philip was also at the time of his second residence in Rome as a scholar. The brothers lived together on Via della Croce near Piazza di Spagna. They thus had the opportunity to share their common interest in Classical art.

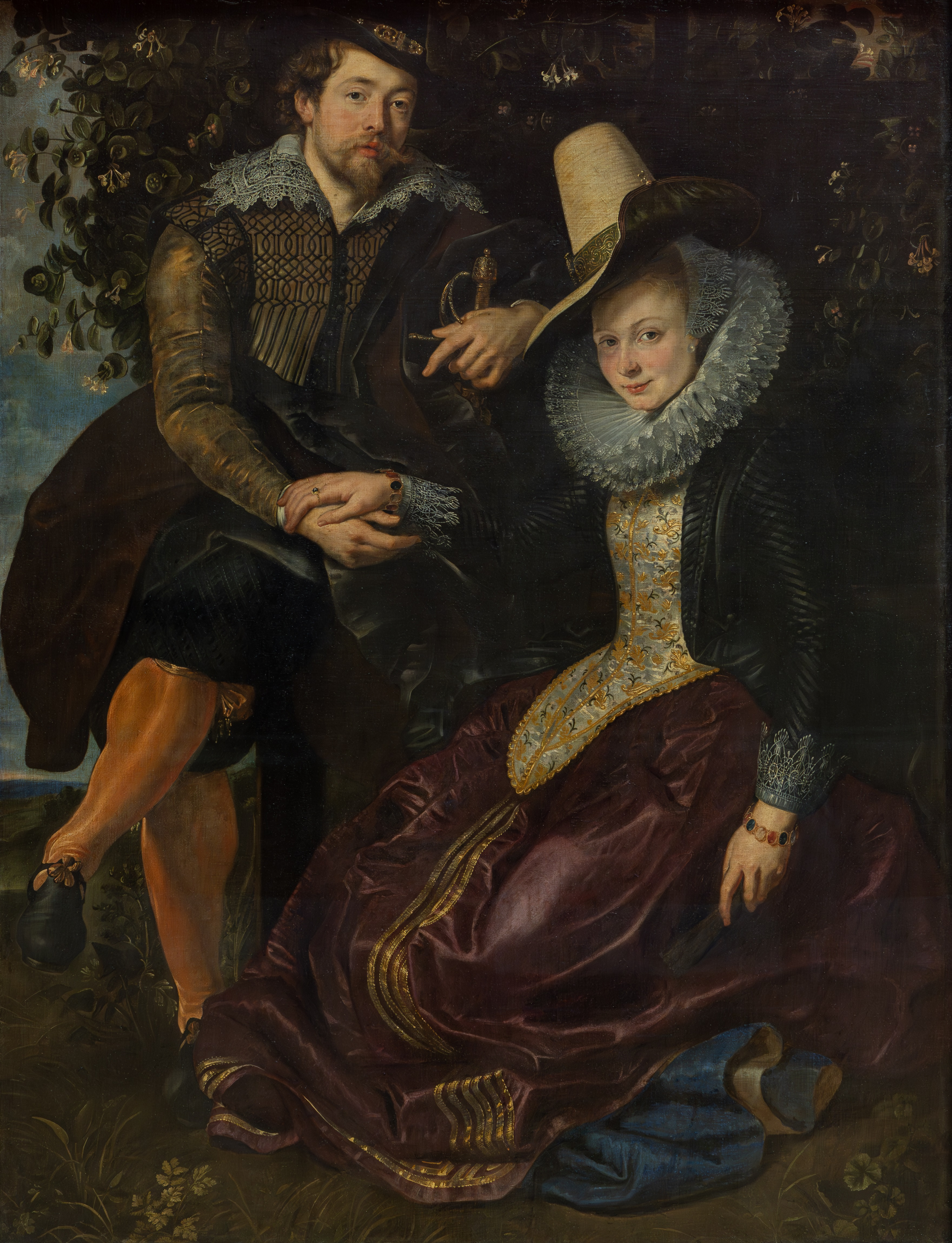
Rubens and Isabella Brant, the Honeysuckle Bower, c. 1609, Alte Pinakothek

Rubens's experiences in Italy continued to influence his work even after his return to Flanders. His stay in Italy had also allowed him to build a network of friendships with important figures of his time such as the scientist Galileo Galilei whom he included as the central figure in the friendship portrait he painted in Mantua known as the Self-Portrait in a Circle of Friends from Mantua. Rubens continued to correspond with many of his friends and contacts in Italian, signed his name as "Pietro Paolo Rubens", and spoke longingly of returning to the peninsula—a wish that never materialised. Rubens was a polyglot who corresponded not only in Italian and Dutch, but also in French, Spanish and Latin. His mother tongue and most commonly used idiom remained, however, the dialect of Brabant. This is demonstrated in that he wrote his most spontaneous letters in that dialect and also used it for the notes on his drawings and designs.

=== Antwerp (1609–1621) ===
Upon hearing of his mother's illness in 1608, Rubens planned his departure from Italy for Antwerp, but she died before he arrived home. His return coincided with a period of renewed prosperity in the city with the signing of the Treaty of Antwerp in April 1609, which initiated the Twelve Years' Truce. In September 1609 Rubens was appointed as court painter by Albert VII, Archduke of Austria, and Infanta Isabella Clara Eugenia of Spain, sovereigns of the Spanish Netherlands.

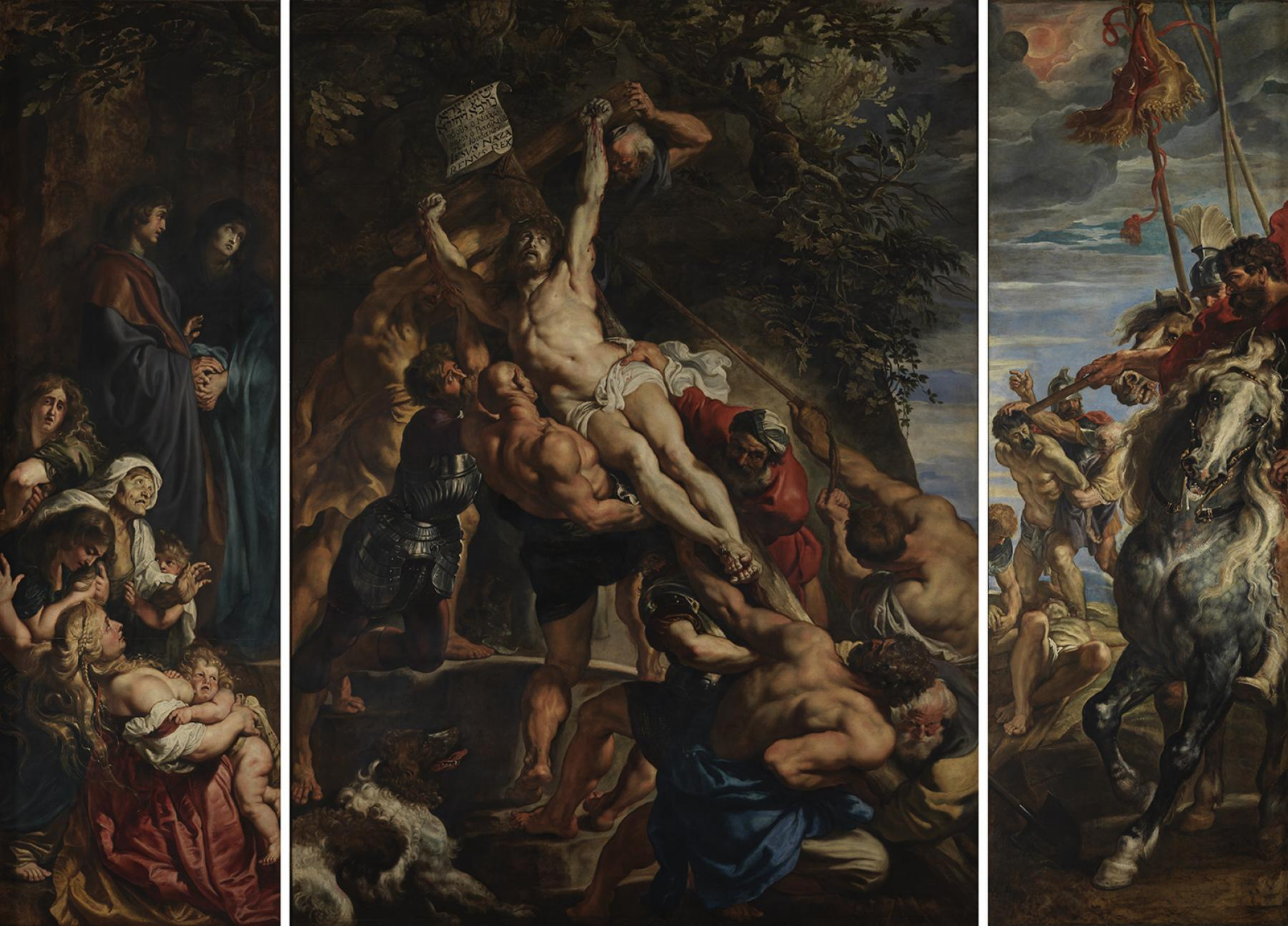
The Elevation of the Cross, 1610–11, Antwerp Cathedral

He received special permission to base his studio in Antwerp instead of at their court in Brussels, and to also work for other clients. He remained close to the Archduchess Isabella until her death in 1633, and was called upon as a painter and also as an ambassador and diplomat. Rubens further cemented his ties to the city when, on 3 October 1609, he married Isabella Brant, the daughter of a leading Antwerp citizen and humanist, Jan Brant.

In 1610, Rubens moved into a new house and studio that he designed. Now the Rubenshuis Museum, the Italian-influenced villa in the centre of Antwerp accommodated his workshop, where he and his apprentices made most of the paintings, and his personal art collection and library, both among the most extensive in Antwerp. During this time he built up a studio with numerous students and assistants. His most famous pupil was the young Anthony van Dyck, who soon became the leading Flemish portraitist and collaborated frequently with Rubens. He also often collaborated with the many specialists active in the city, including the animal painter Frans Snyders, who contributed the eagle to Prometheus Bound (c. 1611–12, completed by 1618), and his good friend the flower-painter Jan Brueghel the Elder. Rubens built another house to the north of Antwerp in the polder village of Doel, "Hooghuis" (1613/1643), perhaps as an investment. The "High House" was built next to the village church.

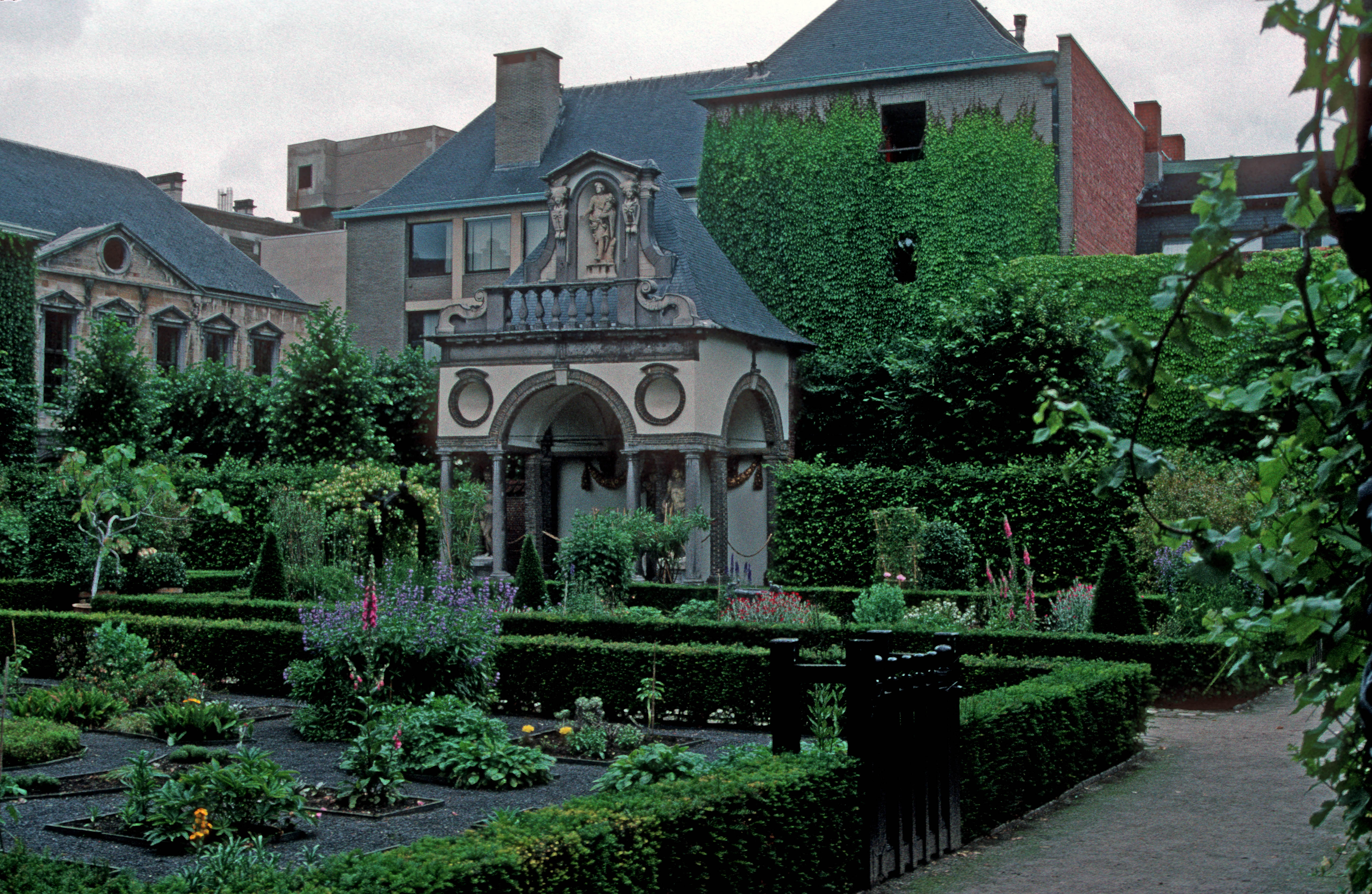
The garden of Rubens's residence in Antwerp, designed by himself

Altarpieces such as The Raising of the Cross (1610) and The Descent from the Cross (1611–1614) for the Cathedral of Our Lady in Antwerp were particularly important in establishing Rubens as Flanders' leading painter shortly after his return. The Raising of the Cross, for example, demonstrates the artist's synthesis of Tintoretto's Crucifixion for the Scuola Grande di San Rocco in Venice, Michelangelo's dynamic figures, and Rubens's own personal style. This painting has been held as a prime example of Baroque religious art. Rubens also produced a number of pictures for the epitaphs of his friends and associates, including The Rockox Triptych for his close friend Nicolaas Rockox.

Rubens relied on the production of prints and book title-pages, especially for his friend Balthasar Moretus, the owner of the large Plantin-Moretus publishing house, to extend his fame throughout Europe during this part of his career. In 1618, Rubens embarked upon a printmaking enterprise by soliciting an unusual triple privilege (an early form of copyright) to protect his designs in France, the Spanish Netherlands, and Dutch Republic. He enlisted Lucas Vorsterman to engrave a number of his notable religious and mythological paintings, to which Rubens appended personal and professional dedications to noteworthy individuals in the Spanish Netherlands, United Provinces, England, France, and Spain. With the exception of a few etchings, Rubens left the printmaking to specialists, who included Lucas Vorsterman, Paulus Pontius and Willem Panneels. He recruited a number of engravers trained by Christoffel Jegher, whom he carefully schooled in the more vigorous style he wanted. Rubens also designed the last significant woodcuts before the 19th-century revival in the technique.

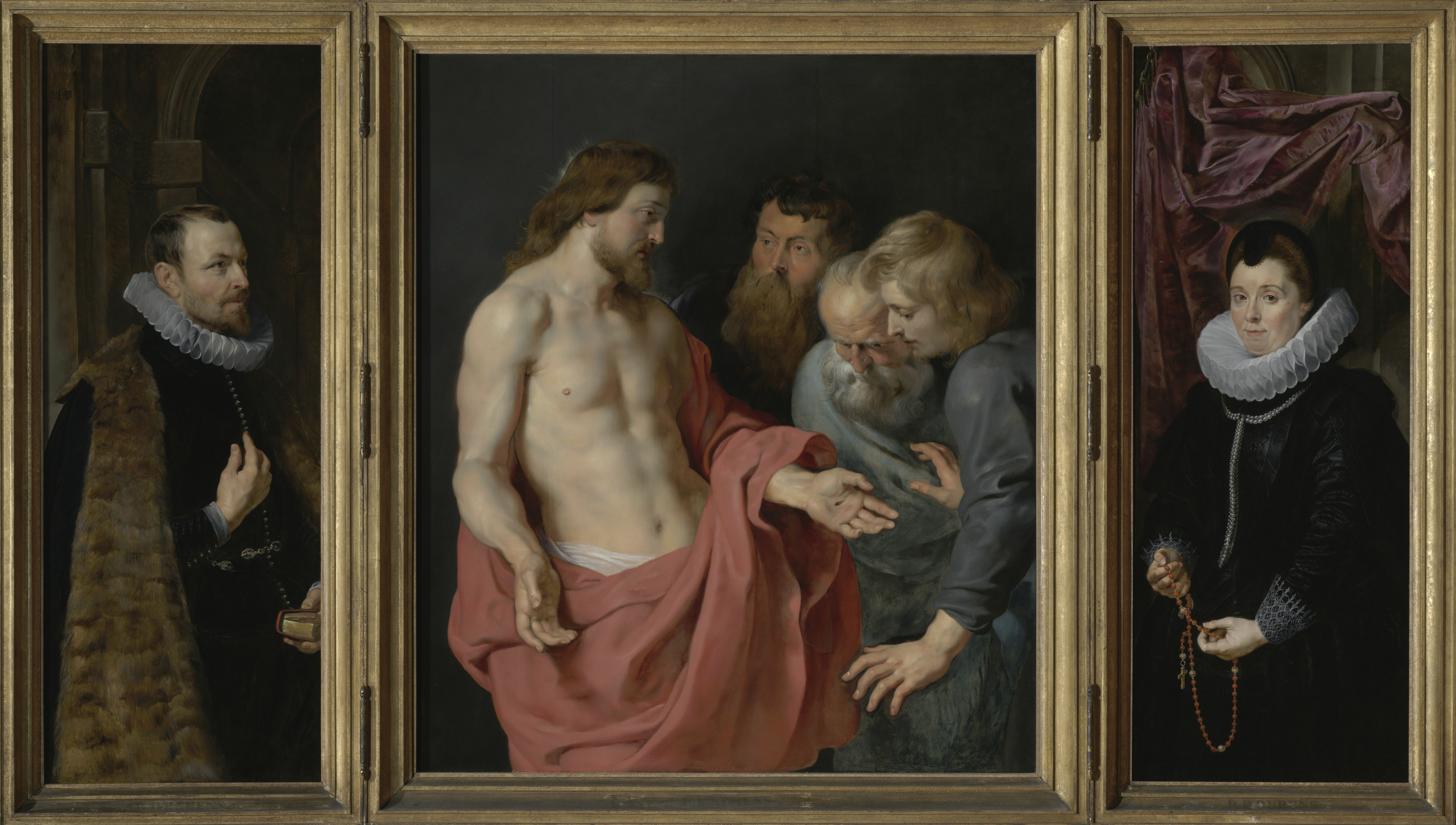
The Rockox Triptych, 1613-15

=== Marie de' Medici Cycle and diplomatic missions (1621–1630) ===
In 1621, the Queen Mother of France, Marie de' Medici, commissioned Rubens to paint two large allegorical cycles celebrating her life and the life of her late husband, Henry IV, for the Luxembourg Palace in Paris. The Marie de' Medici cycle (now in the Louvre) was installed in 1625, and although he began work on the second series it was never completed. Marie was exiled from France in 1630 by her son, Louis XIII, and died in 1642 in the same house in Cologne where Rubens had lived as a child.

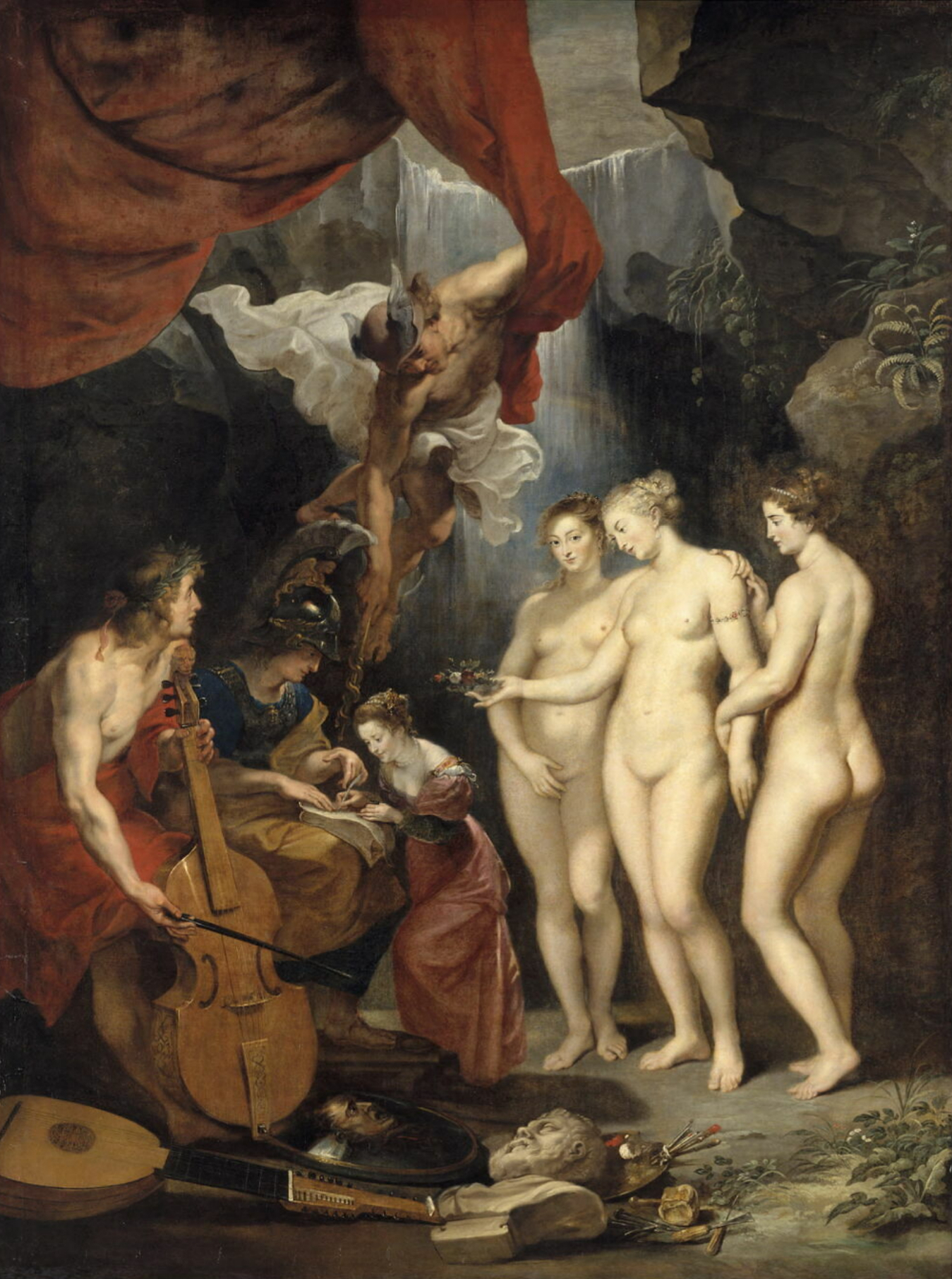
The Education of Marie de' Medici, c. 1624

After the end of the Twelve Years' Truce in 1621, the Spanish Habsburg rulers entrusted Rubens with diplomatic missions. While in Paris in 1622 to discuss the Marie de' Medici cycle, Rubens engaged in clandestine information gathering activities, which at the time was an important task of diplomats. He relied on his friendship with Nicolas-Claude Fabri de Peiresc to get information on political developments in France. Between 1627 and 1630, Rubens was very active as a diplomat. He travelled between the courts of Spain and England in an attempt to bring about peace between the Catholic Spanish Netherlands and the Protestant Dutch Republic. He also made several trips to the Dutch Republic as both an artist and a diplomat.

Some members of the courts he visited did not treat him as an equal as they held that courtiers should not use their hands in any art or trade, but he was also received as an equal gentleman by many others. Rubens was raised by Philip IV of Spain to the nobility in 1624 and knighted by Charles I of England in 1630. Philip IV confirmed Rubens's status as a knight a few months later. Rubens was awarded an honorary Master of Arts degree from Cambridge University in 1629.

Rubens was in Madrid for eight months in 1628 to 1629. In addition to diplomatic negotiations, he executed several important works for Philip IV and private patrons. He also began a renewed study of Titian's paintings, copying numerous works including the Madrid Fall of Man (1628–29). During this stay, he befriended the court painter Diego Velázquez and the two planned to travel to Italy together the following year. Rubens, however, returned to Antwerp and Velázquez made the journey without him.

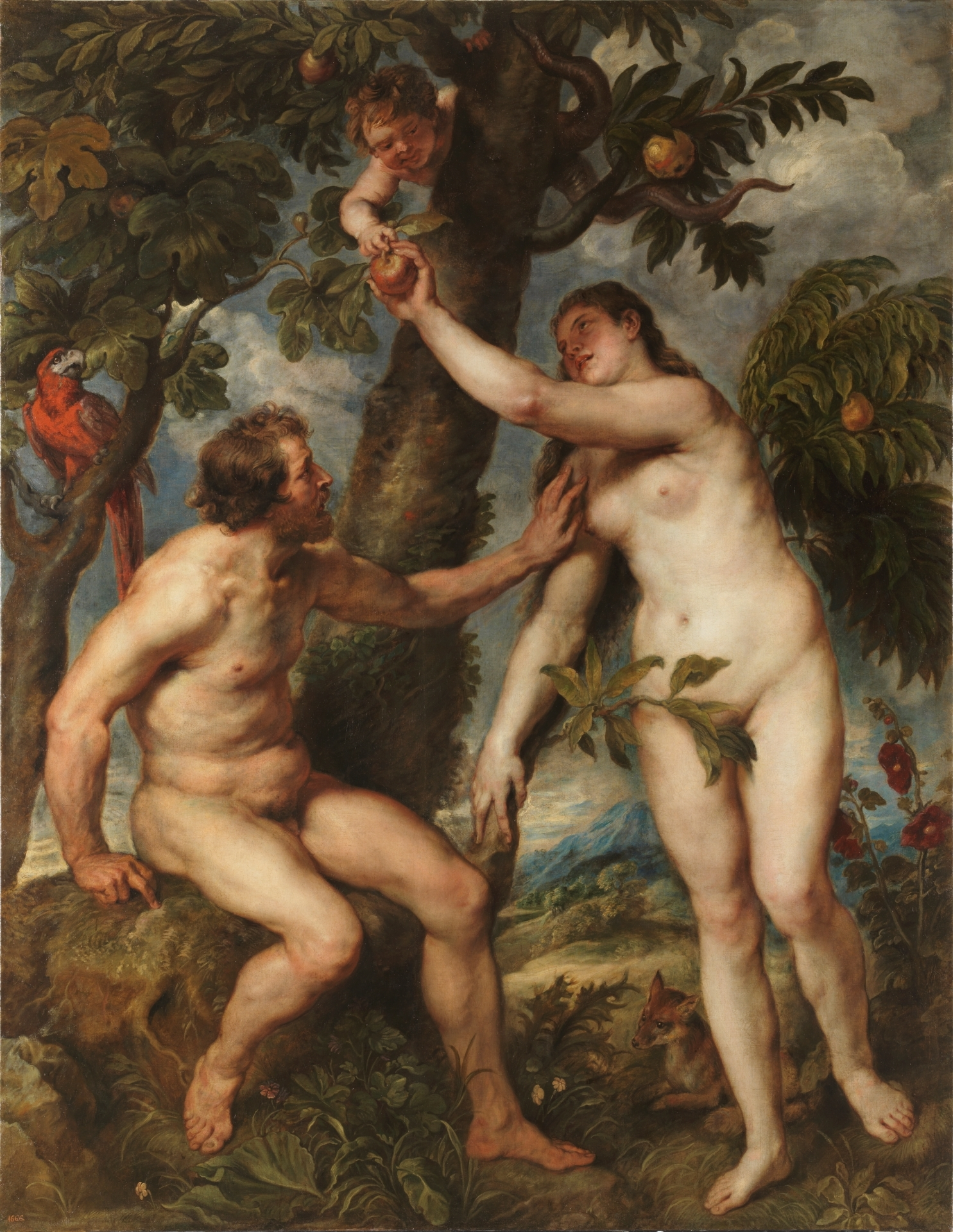
The Fall of Man, 1628–'29, Museo del Prado

His stay in Antwerp was brief, and he soon travelled on to London where he remained until April 1630. An important work from this period is the Allegory of Peace and War (1629; National Gallery London). It illustrates the artist's lively concern for peace, and was given to Charles I as a gift.

While Rubens's international reputation with collectors and nobility abroad continued to grow during this decade, he and his workshop also continued to paint monumental paintings for local patrons in Antwerp. The Assumption of the Virgin Mary (1625–26) for the Cathedral of Antwerp is one prominent example.

=== Last decade (1630–1640) ===
Rubens's last decade was spent in and around Antwerp. Major works for foreign patrons still occupied him, such as the ceiling paintings for Inigo Jones's Banqueting House at the Palace of Whitehall, but he also explored more personal artistic directions.

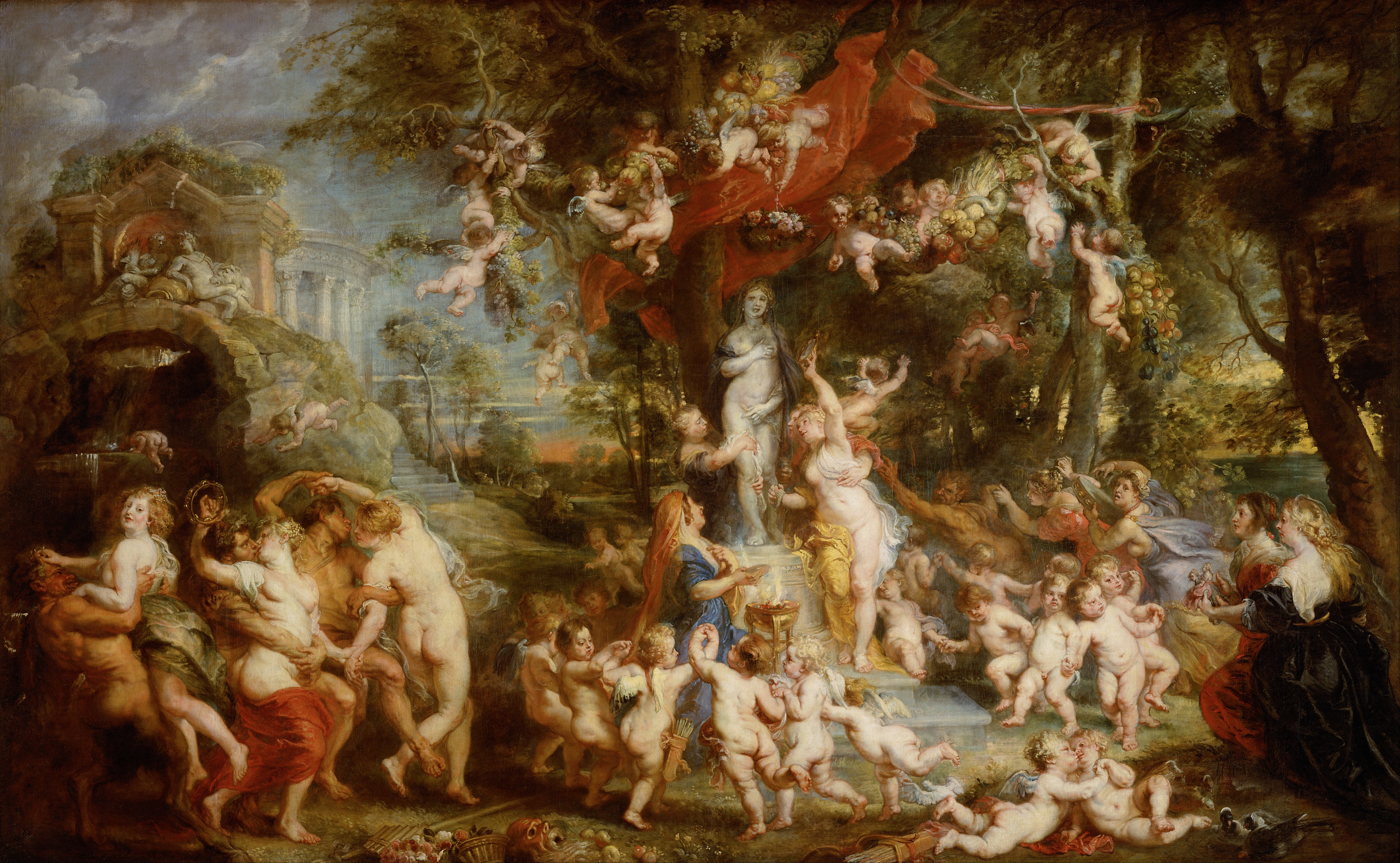
The Feast of Venus

In 1630, four years after the death of his first wife Isabella, the 53-year-old painter married the sister of her brother-in-law, the 16-year-old Helena Fourment. In his letters he stated that he would rather remarry a 16-year-old girl from the bourgeoisie than a lady from the nobility and explained that the primary reason for remarrying was sexual. Helene became the older artist's muse and was the inspiration for the voluptuous figures in many of his paintings from the 1630s, including The Feast of Venus (Kunsthistorisches Museum, Vienna), The Three Graces and The Judgement of Paris (both Prado, Madrid). In the latter painting, which was made for the Spanish court, the artist's young wife was recognised by viewers in the figure of Venus. In an intimate portrait of her, Helena Fourment in a Fur Wrap, also known as Het Pelsken, Rubens's wife is even partially modelled after classical sculptures of the Venus Pudica, such as the Medici Venus.

In 1635, Rubens bought an estate outside Antwerp, the Steen, where he spent much of his time. Landscapes, such as his A View of Het Steen in the Early Morning (National Gallery, London) and Farmers Returning from the Fields (Palatine Gallery, Palazzo Pitti, Florence), reflect the more personal nature of many of his later works. He also drew upon the Netherlandish traditions of Pieter Bruegel the Elder for inspiration in later works like Feasting and dancing peasants (c. 1630, Louvre).

=== Death ===
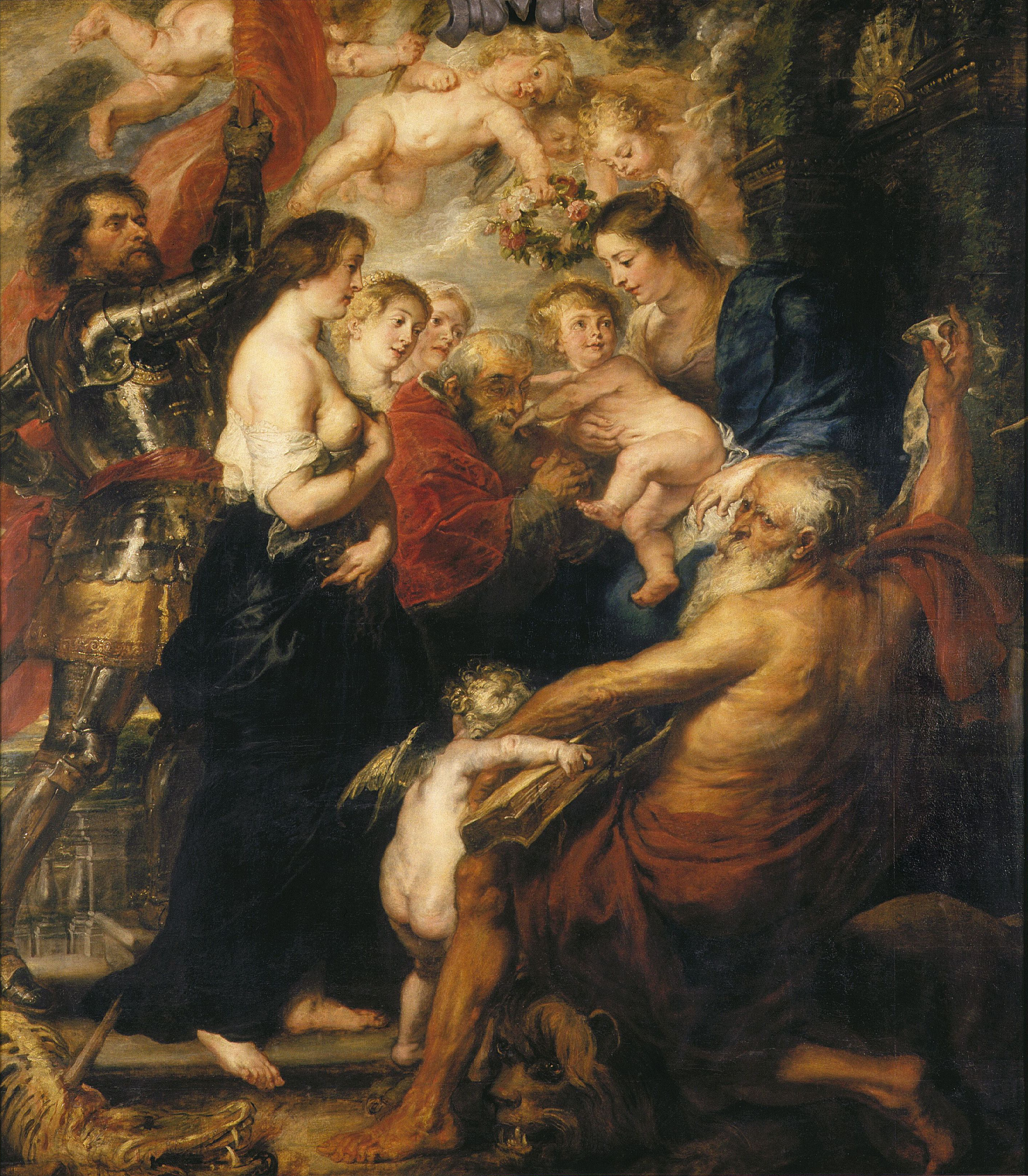
Virgin and child with saints, 1638–'39

Rubens died from heart failure as a result of his chronic gout on 30 May 1640. He was interred in Saint James' Church, Antwerp. A burial chapel for the artist and his family was built in the church. Construction on the chapel started in 1642 and was completed in 1650, when Cornelis van Mildert (the son of Rubens's friend, the sculptor Johannes van Mildert) delivered the altarstone.

The chapel features a marble altar portico with two columns framing the altarpiece of the Virgin and child with Saints painted by Rubens himself. The painting expresses the basic tenets of the Counter-Reformation through the figures of the Virgin and saints. In the upper niche of the retable is a marble statue depicting the Virgin as the Mater Dolorosa, whose heart is pierced by a sword, which was likely sculpted by Lucas Faydherbe, a pupil of Rubens. The remains of Rubens's second wife, Helena Fourment, and two of her children (one of whom was fathered by Rubens) were later also laid to rest in the chapel. Over the coming centuries about 80 descendants from the Rubens family were interred in the chapel.

At the request of canon van Parijs, Rubens's epitaph, written in Latin by his friend Gaspar Gevartius, was chiselled on the chapel floor. In the tradition of the Renaissance, Rubens is compared in the epitaph to Apelles, the most famous painter of Greek Antiquity.

== Work ==
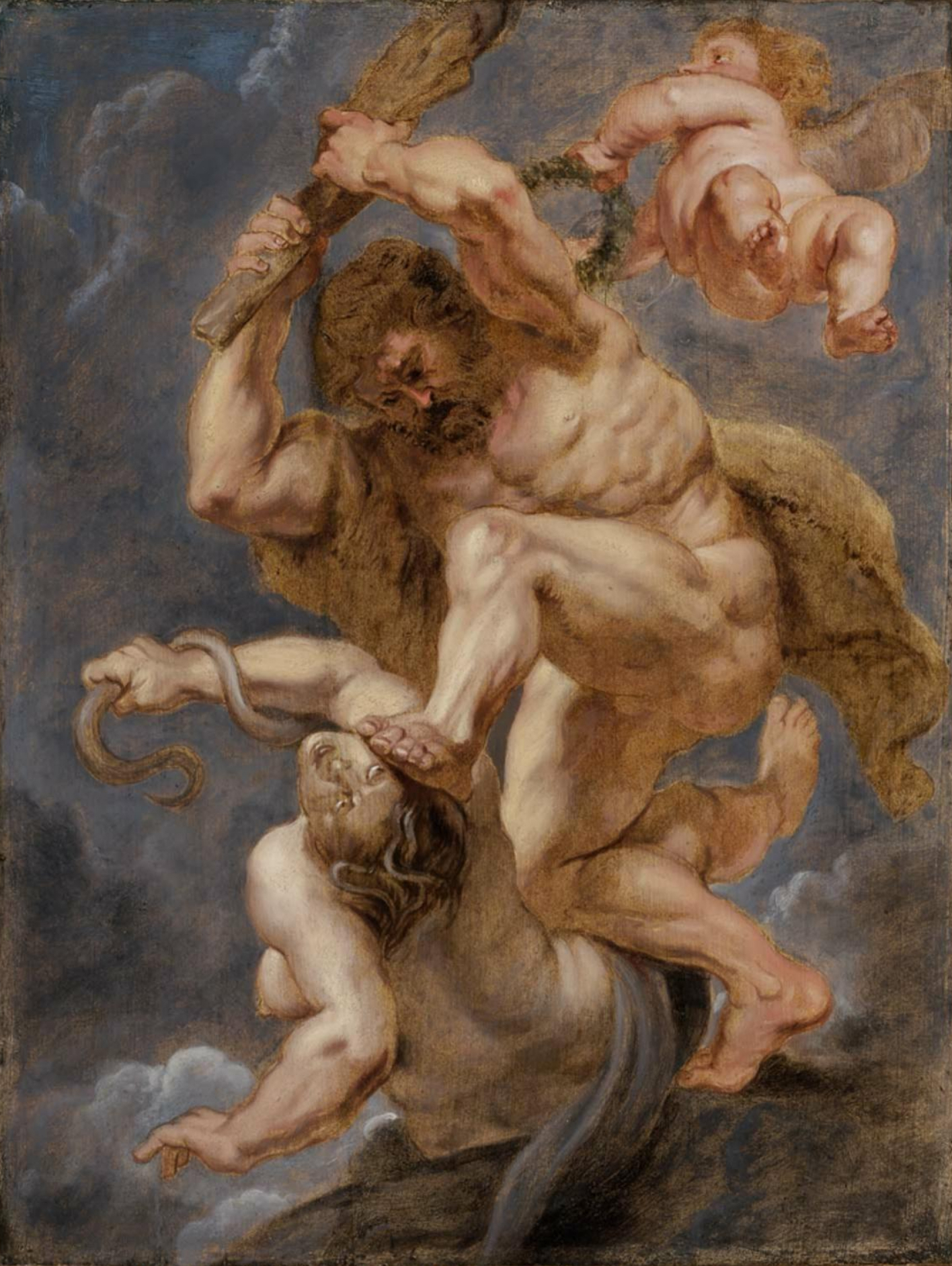
Hercules as Heroic Virtue Overcoming Discord, 1632–'33

His biblical and mythological nudes are especially well-known. Painted in the Baroque tradition of depicting women as soft-bodied, passive, and to the modern eye highly sexualised beings, his nudes emphasise the concepts of fertility, desire, physical beauty, temptation, and virtue. Skilfully rendered, these paintings of nude women are thought by feminists to have been created to sexually appeal to his largely male audience of patrons, although the female nude as an example of beauty has been a traditional motif in European art for centuries. Rubens was quite fond of painting full-figured women, giving rise to terms like 'Rubensian' or 'Rubenesque' (sometimes 'Rubensesque'). His large-scale cycle representing Marie de' Medici focuses on several classic female archetypes like the virgin, consort, wife, widow, and diplomatic regent. The inclusion of this iconography in his female portraits, along with his art depicting noblewomen of the day, serve to elevate his female portrait sitters to the status and importance of his male portrait sitters.

Rubens's depiction of males is equally stylised, replete with meaning, and quite the opposite of his female subjects. His male nudes represent highly athletic and large mythical or biblical men. Unlike his female nudes, most of his male nudes are depicted partially nude, with sashes, armour, or shadows shielding them from being completely unclothed. These men are twisting, reaching, bending, and grasping: all of which portrays his male subjects engaged in a great deal of physical, sometimes aggressive, action. The concepts Rubens artistically represents illustrate the male as powerful, capable, forceful and compelling. The allegorical and symbolic subjects he painted reference the classic masculine tropes of athleticism, high achievement, valour in war, and civil authority. Male archetypes readily found in Rubens's paintings include the hero, husband, father, civic leader, king, and the battle weary.

=== Workshop ===
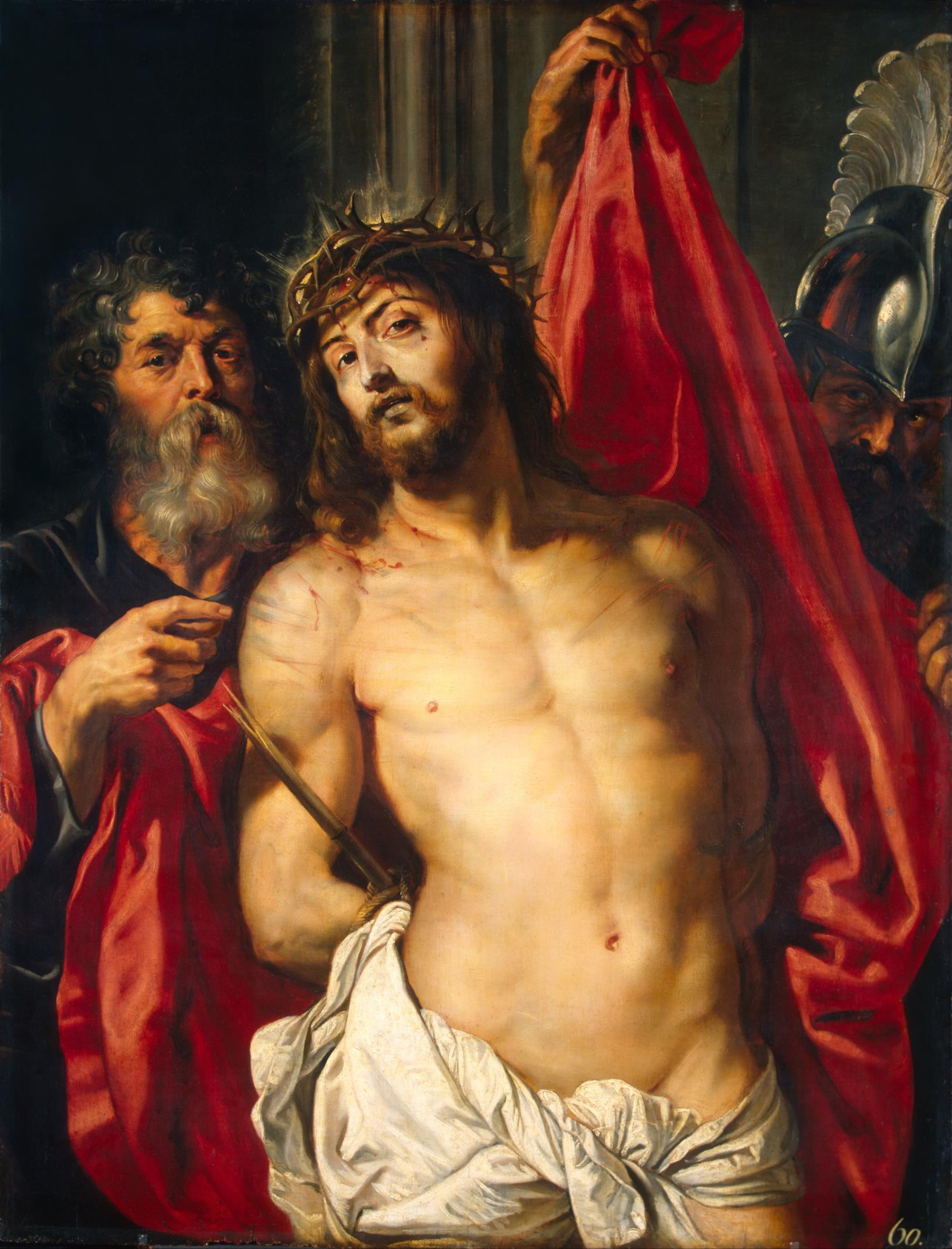
Ecce Homo, or Christ wearing the Crown of Thorns, 1612, Hermitage Museum, Saint Petersburg

Rubens's workshop paintings can be divided into three categories: those he painted by himself, those he painted in part (mainly hands and faces), and copies supervised from his drawings or oil sketches. As was customary at the time, he ran a large workshop with many apprentices and students. It has not always been possible to identify Rubens's pupils and assistants, since as a court painter, Rubens was not required to register his pupils with the Antwerp Guild of Saint Luke. About 20 pupils or assistants of Rubens have been identified, with varying levels of evidence to include them as such. It is also unclear from surviving records whether a particular person was a pupil or assistant in Rubens's workshop, or an independent master collaborating on specific works with Rubens. The unknown Jacob Moerman was registered as his pupil, while Willem Panneels and Justus van Egmont were registered in the Guild's records as Rubens's assistants. Anthony van Dyck worked in Rubens's workshop after training with Hendrick van Balen in Antwerp. Other artists linked to the Rubens's workshop as pupils, assistants or collaborators are Abraham van Diepenbeeck, Lucas Faydherbe, Lucas Franchoys the Younger, Nicolaas van der Horst, Frans Luycx, Peter van Mol, Deodat del Monte, Cornelis Schut, Erasmus Quellinus the Younger, Pieter Soutman, David Teniers the Elder, Frans Wouters, Jan Thomas van Ieperen, Theodoor van Thulden, Francoys/Françoise van Uffelen and Victor Wolfvoet (II).

He also often subcontracted elements such as animals, landscapes or still-lifes in large compositions to specialists such as animal painters Frans Snyders and Paul de Vos, or other artists such as Jacob Jordaens. One of his most frequent collaborators was Jan Brueghel the Elder.

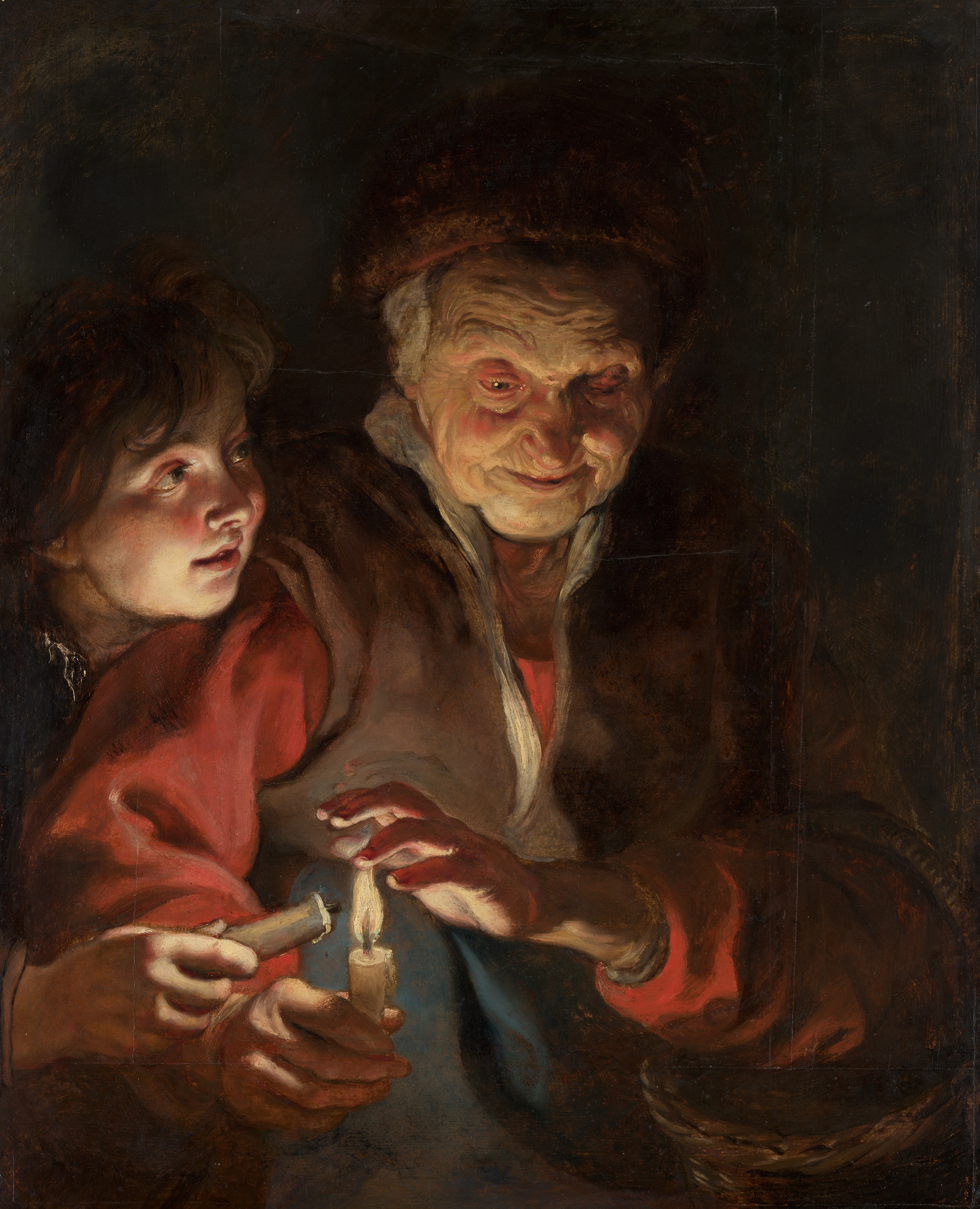
Old Woman and Boy with Candles, c. 1616/17

== Selected exhibitions ==
- 1936: Rubens and His Times, Paris.
- 1997: The Century of Rubens in French Collections, Paris.
- 2004: Rubens, Palais des Beaux-Arts de Lille
- 2005: Peter Paul Rubens: The Drawings, Metropolitan Museum of Art, New York.
- 2015: Rubens and His Legacy, Royal Academy, London.
- 2017: Rubens: The Power of Transformation, Kunsthistorisches Museum, Vienna.
- 2019: Early Rubens, Art Gallery of Ontario, Toronto, Fine Arts Museums of San Francisco.

== Lost works ==
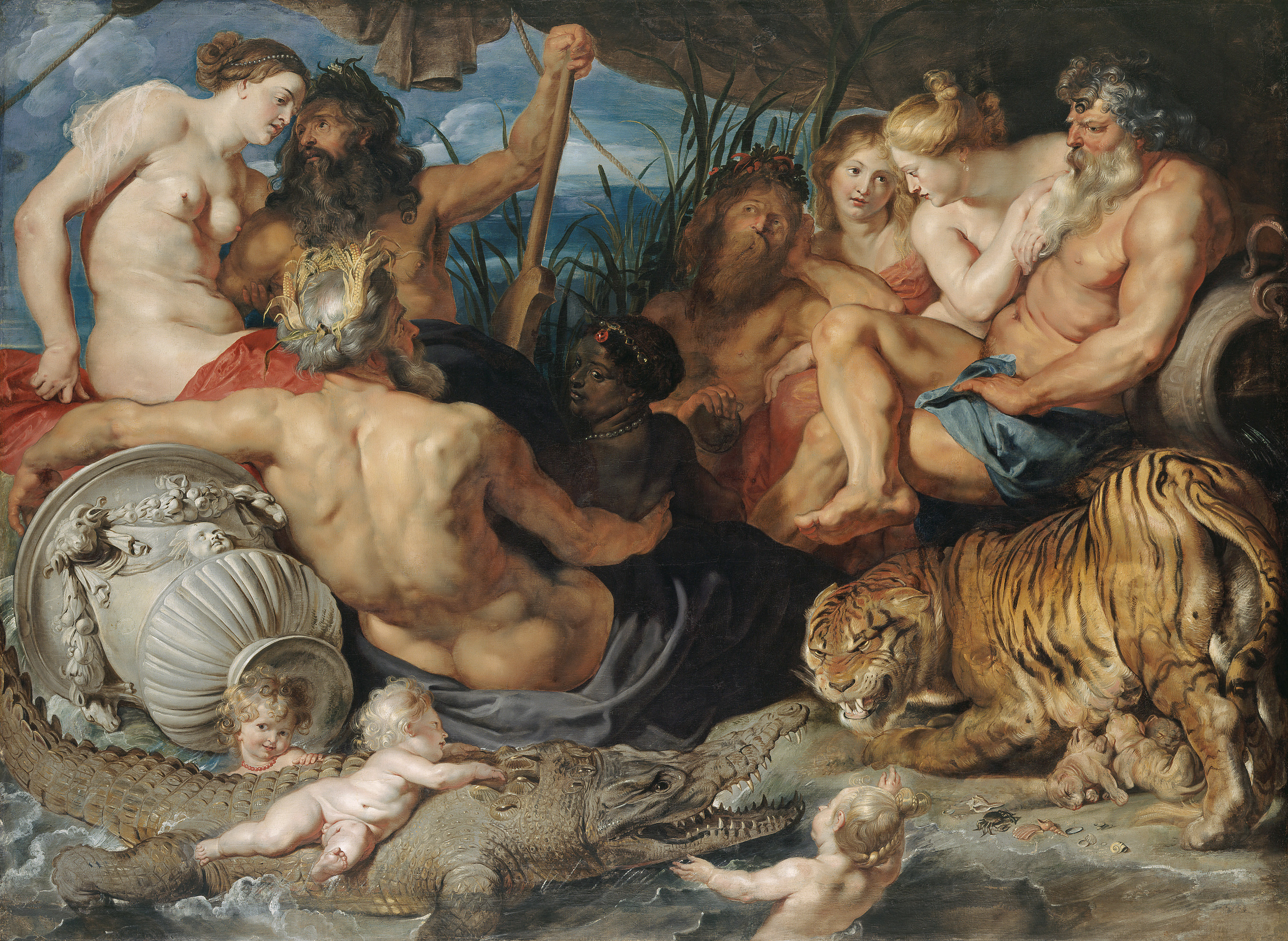
The Four Continents, c. 1615, Kunsthistorisches Museum

Lost works by Rubens include:

- The Crucifixion, painted for the Church of Santa Croce in Gerusalemme, Rome, was imported to England in 1811. It was auctioned in 1812 and again in 1820 and 1821 but was lost at sea sometime after 1821.
- Equestrian Portrait of Archduke Albert
- Susannah and the Elders, sold to Dudley Carleton, 1st Viscount Dorchester in 1618 is now known only from an engraving by Lucas Vorsterman the Elder dated 1620.
- Satyr, Nymph, Putti and Leopards sold to Dudley Carleton, 1st Viscount Dorchester in 1618, is now known only from engraving from 1620 by Lucas Vorsterman the Elder.
- Judith Beheading Holofernes c. 1609 known only through the 1610 engraving by Cornelis Galle the Elder.
- Works destroyed in the bombardment of Brussels include:
  - Madonna of the Rosary painted for the Royal Chapel of the Dominican Church
  - Virgin Adorned with Flowers by Saint Anne, 1610 painted for the Church of the Carmelite Friars
  - Saint Job Triptych, 1613, painted for Saint Nicholas Church
  - Cambyses Appointing Otanes Judge, Judgment of Solomon, and Last Judgment, all for the Magistrates' Hall
- In the Coudenberg Palace fire there were several works by Rubens destroyed, like Nativity (1731), Adoration of the Magi and Pentecost.
- The paintings Neptune and Amphitrite, Vision of Saint Hubert and Diana and Nymphs Surprised by Satyrs were destroyed in the Friedrichshain flak tower fire in 1945.
- The painting The Abduction of Proserpine was destroyed in the fire at Blenheim Palace, Oxfordshire, 5 February 1861.
- The painting Crucifixion with Mary, St. John, Magdalen, 1643 was destroyed in the English Civil War by Parliamentarians in the Queen's Chapel, Somerset House, London, 1643
- The painting Equestrian Portrait of Philip IV of Spain was destroyed in the Royal Alcázar of Madrid fire in 1734. A copy is in the Uffizi Gallery.
- The Continence of Scipio was destroyed in a fire in the Western Exchange, Old Bond Street, London, March 1836
- The painting The Lion Hunt was removed by Napoleon's agents from Schleissheim Palace, near Munich, 1800 and was destroyed later in a fire at the Musée des Beaux-Arts de Bordeaux.
- An alleged Rubens painting Portrait of a Girl, reported to have been in the collection of Alexandre Dumas, was reported lost in a fire.
- The painting Equestrian Portrait of the Duke of Buckingham (1625) and the ceiling painting The Duke of Buckingham Triumphing over Envy and Anger (c. 1625), both later owned by the Earl of Jersey at Osterley Park, were destroyed in a fire at the Le Gallais depository in St Helier, Jersey, on 30 September 1949.
- Portrait of Philip IV of Spain from 1628 was destroyed in the incendiary attack at the Kunsthaus Zürich in 1985.
- Portrait of George Villiers, c. 1625 (formerly). This painting that had been deemed lost for nearly 400 years was rediscovered in 2017 in Pollok House, Glasgow, Scotland. Conservation treatment carried out by Simon Rollo Gillespie helped to demonstrate that the work was not a later copy by another artist but was the original.

== Works ==
Early paintings

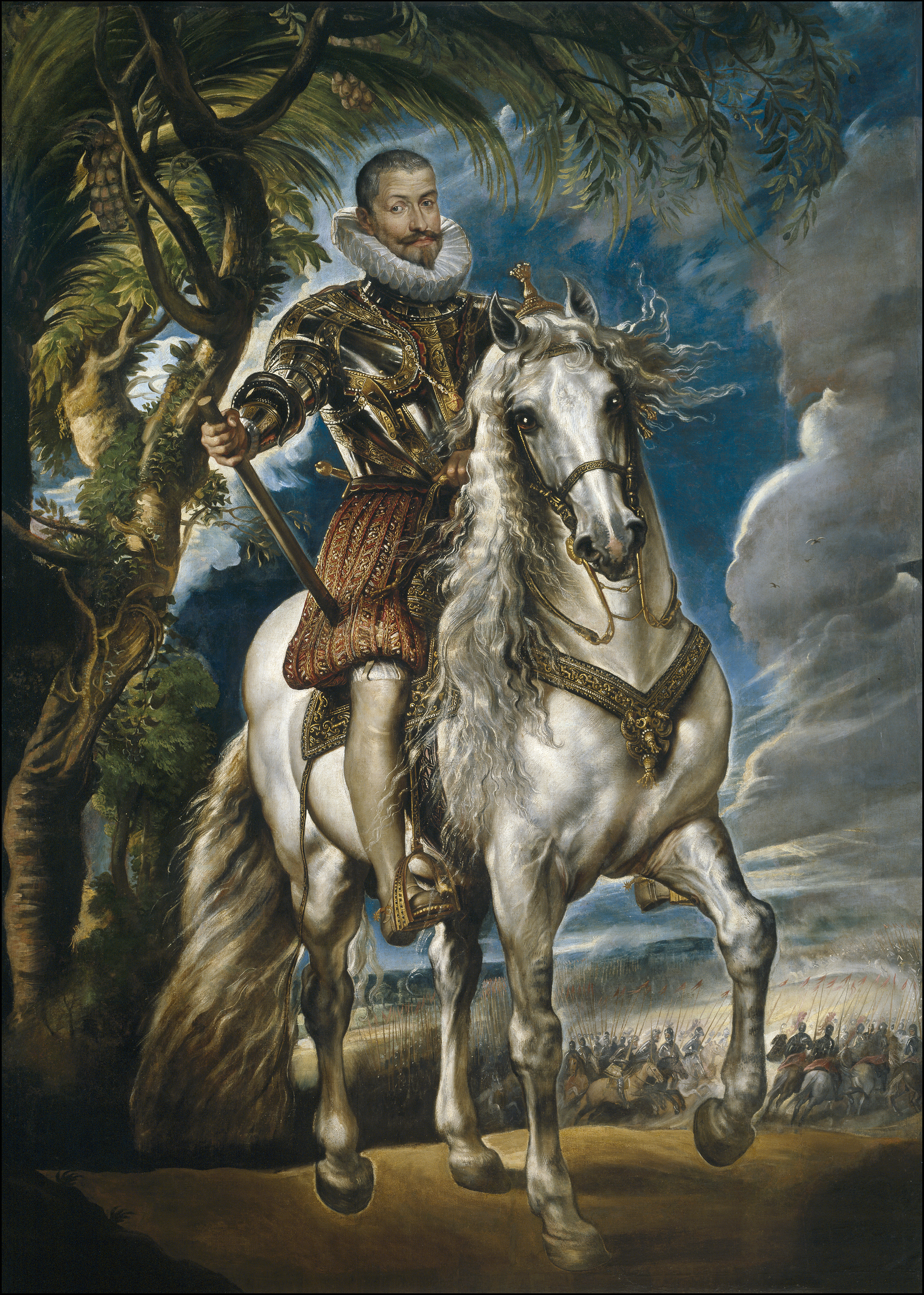
Equestrian Portrait of the Duke of Lerma, 1603, Museo del Prado

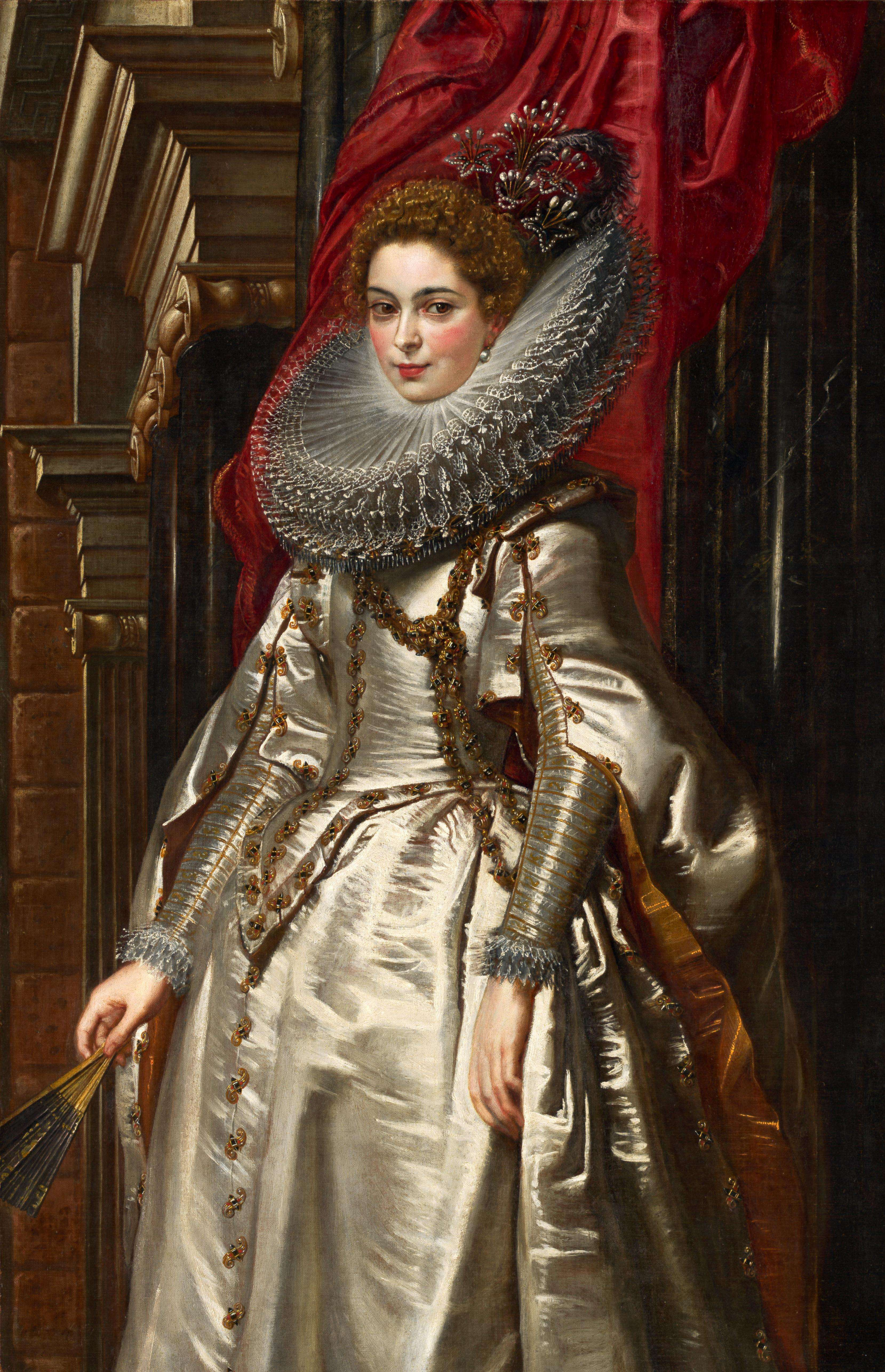
Portrait of Marchesa Brigida Spinola-Doria, 1606, Museo del Prado

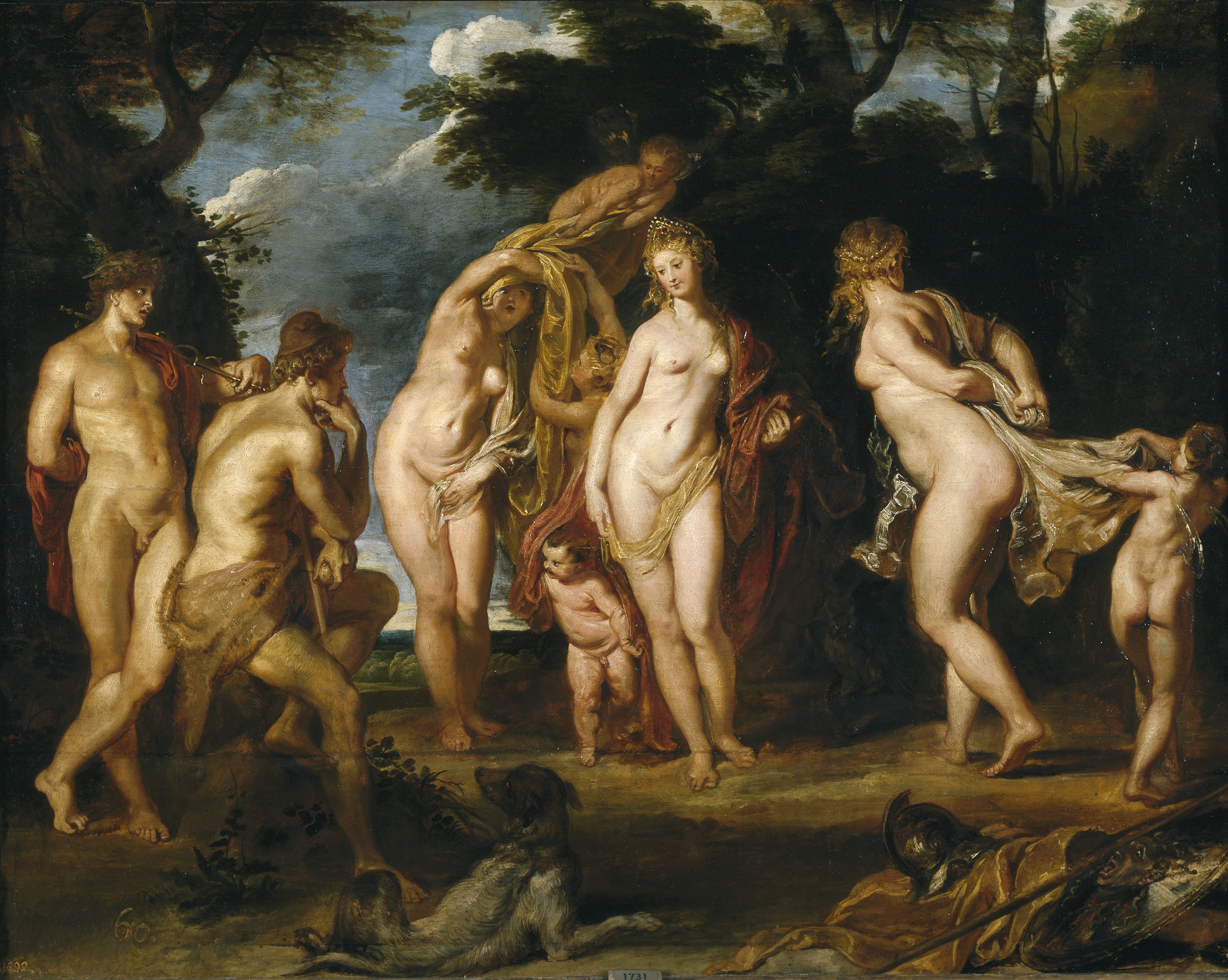
The Judgement of Paris, c. 1606, Museo del Prado

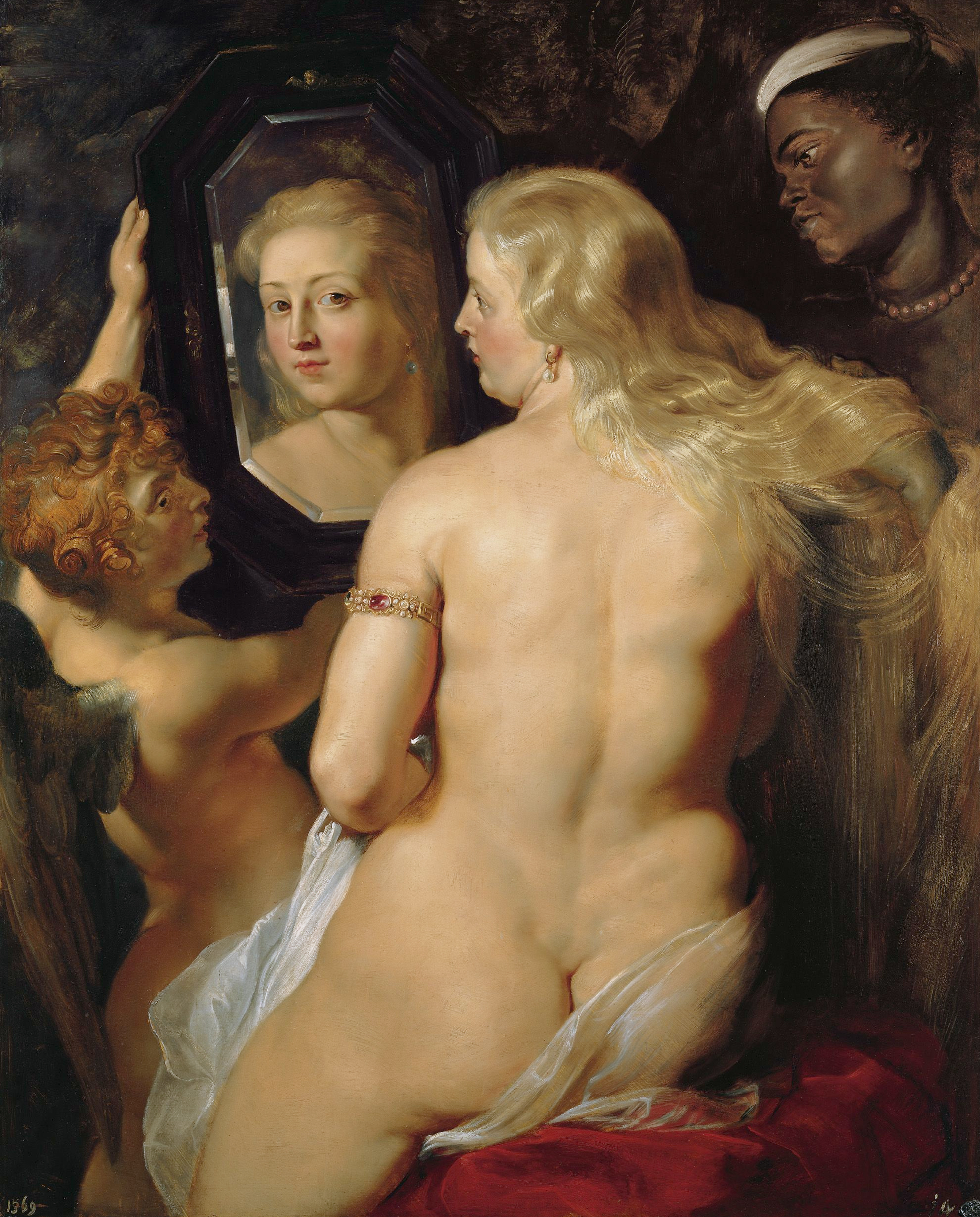
Venus at the Mirror, 1613–14

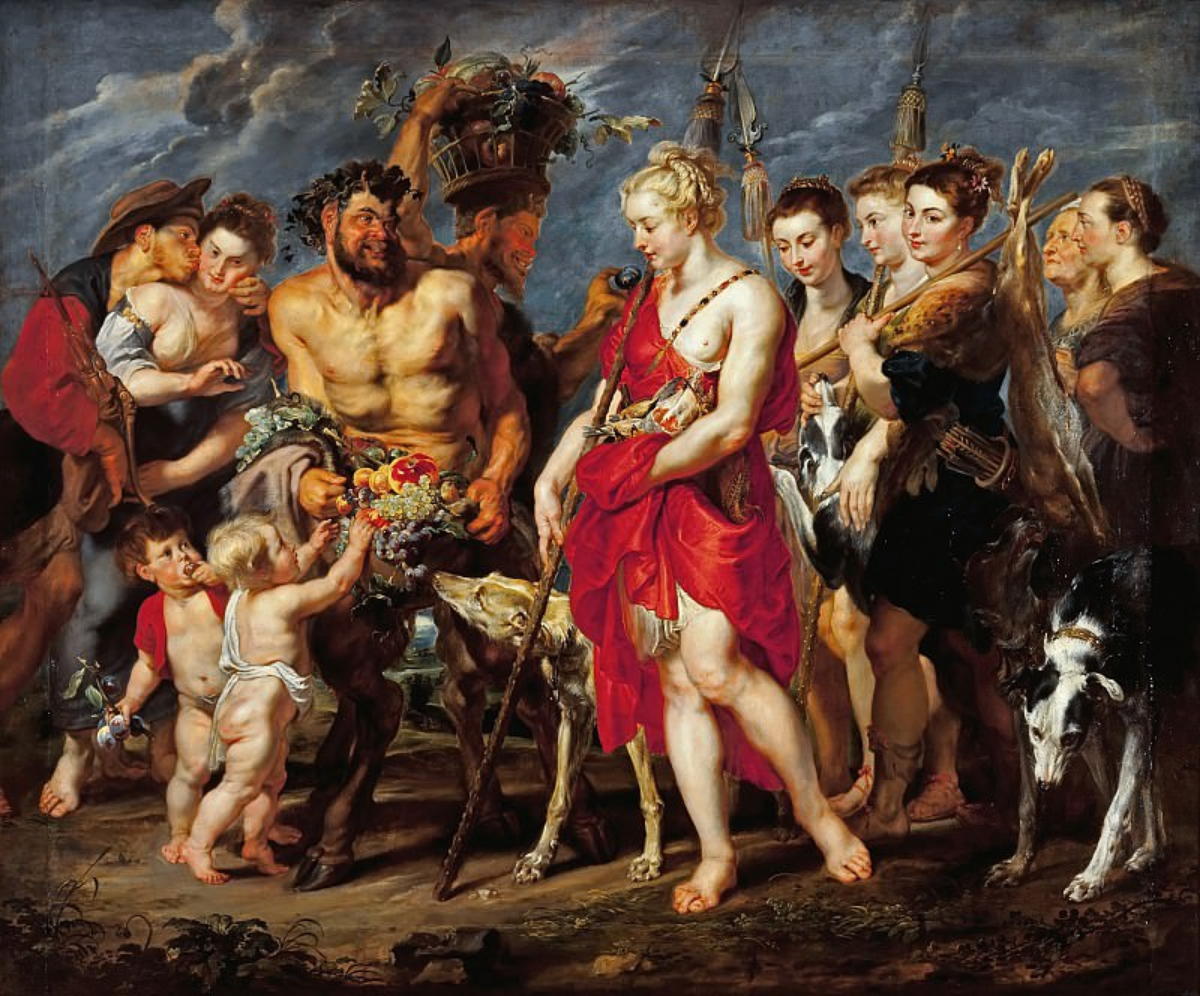
Diana Returning from the Hunt, c. 1617, oil on canvas, Hessisches Landesmuseum Darmstadt, collaboration with Snyders

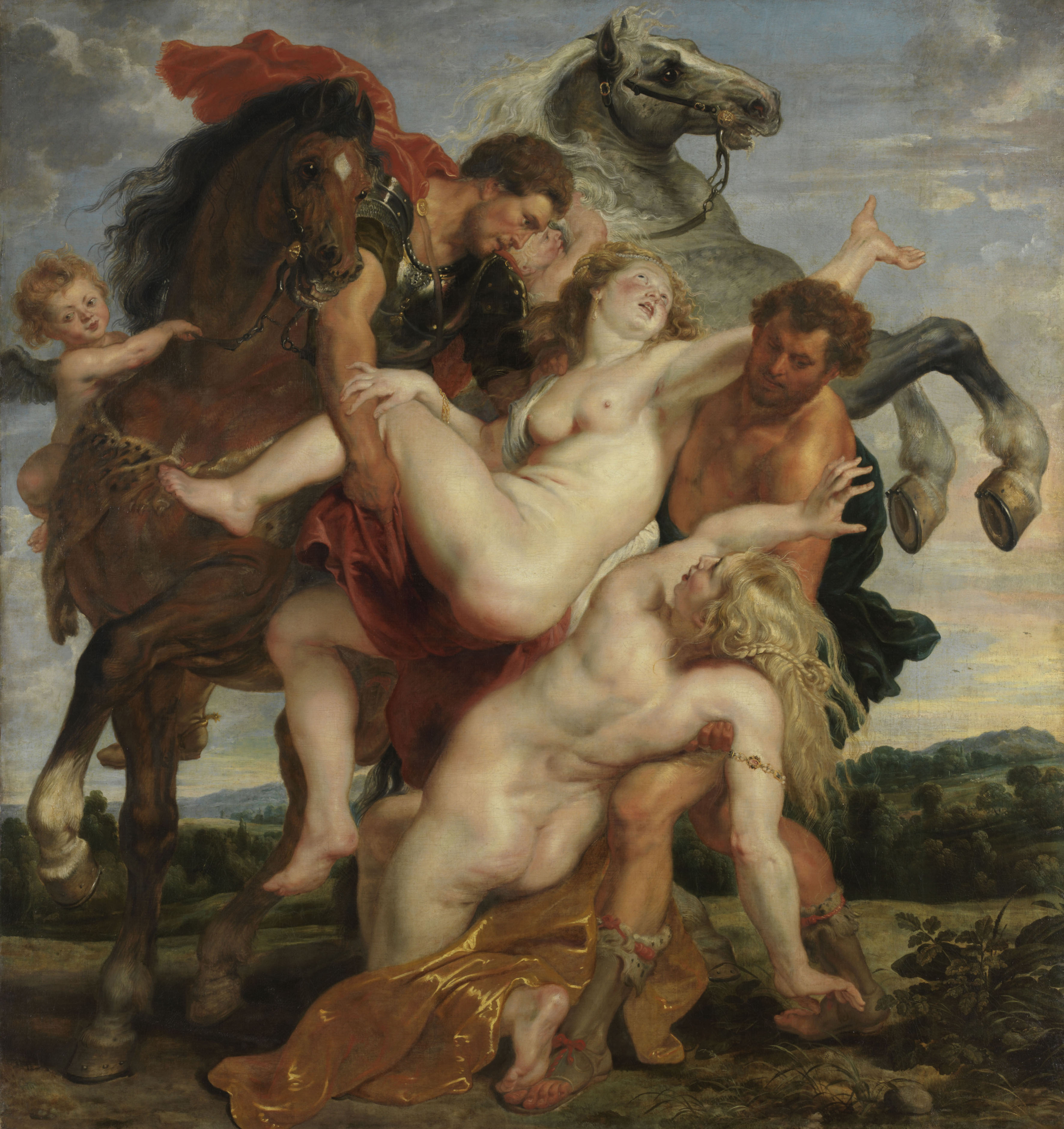
The Rape of the Daughters of Leucippus, Alte Pinakothek
Portraits

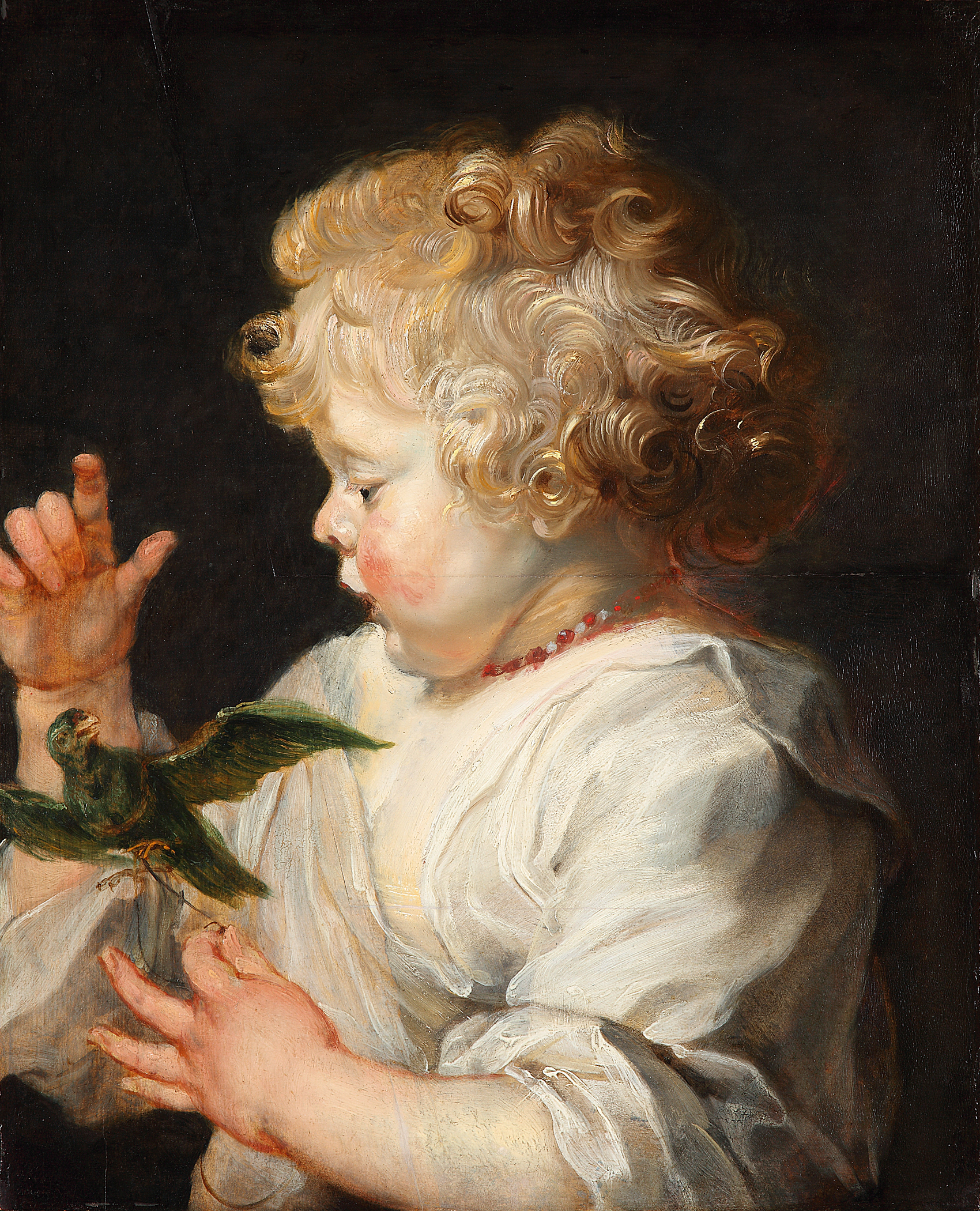
Child with a bird, 1614 and 1625, Gemäldegalerie, Berlin

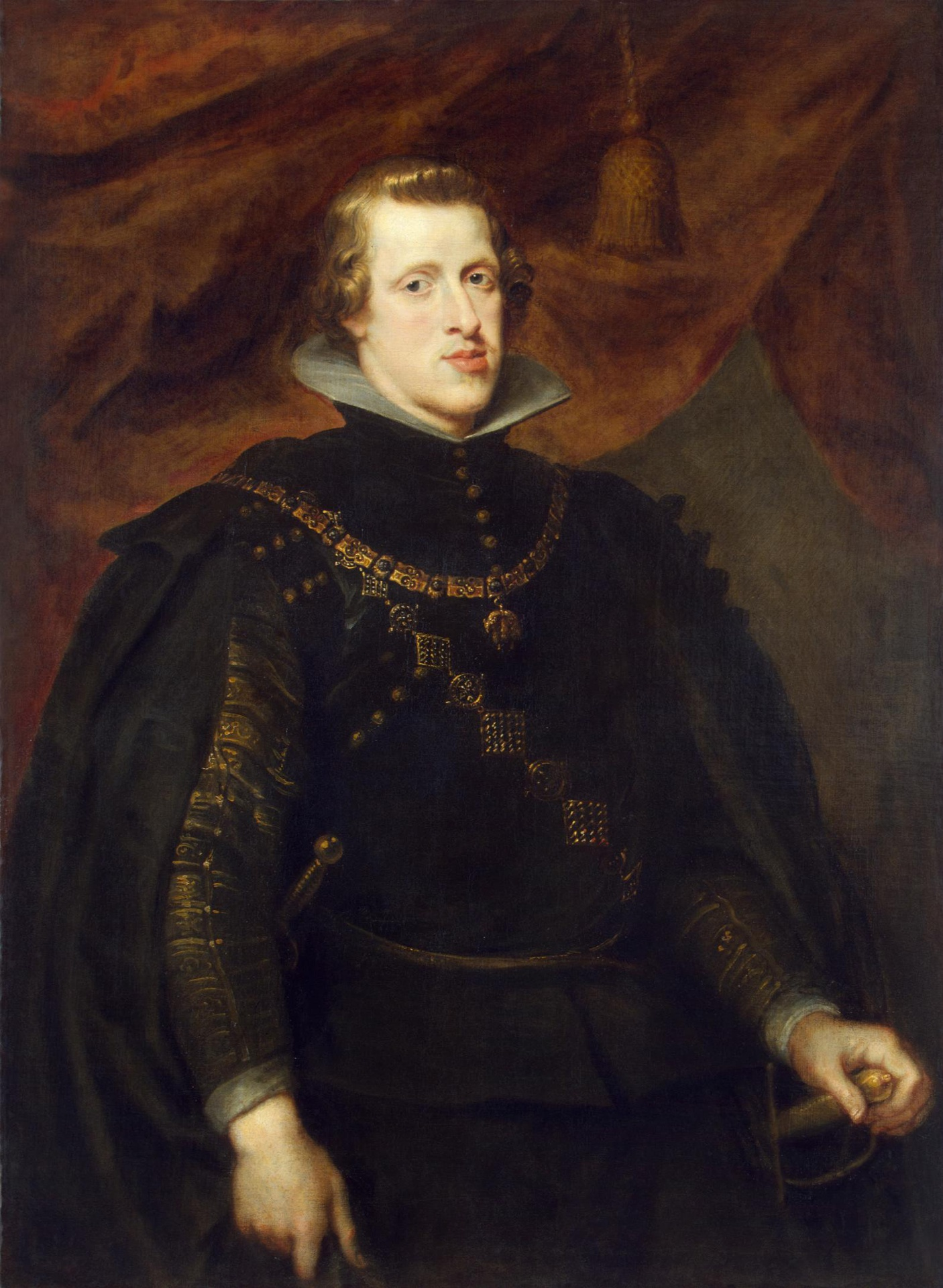
Portrait of King Philip IV of Spain, c. 1628–29

Portrait of Ambrogio Spinola, c. 1627, National Gallery Prague

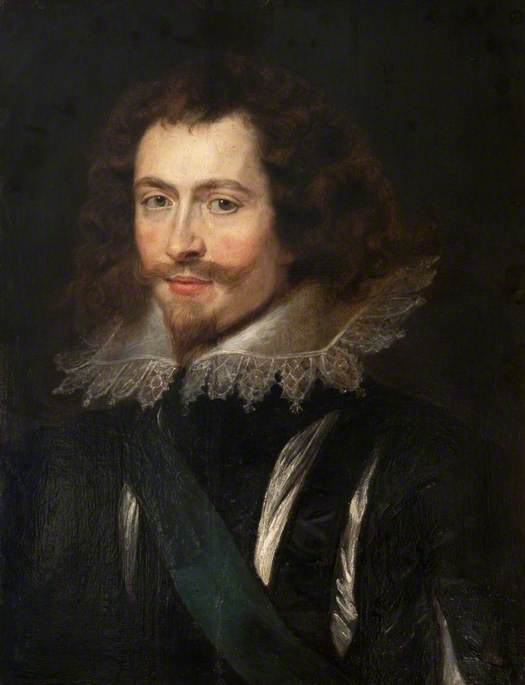
Portrait of George Villiers, 1st Duke of Buckingham, c. 1617–1628, Pollok House

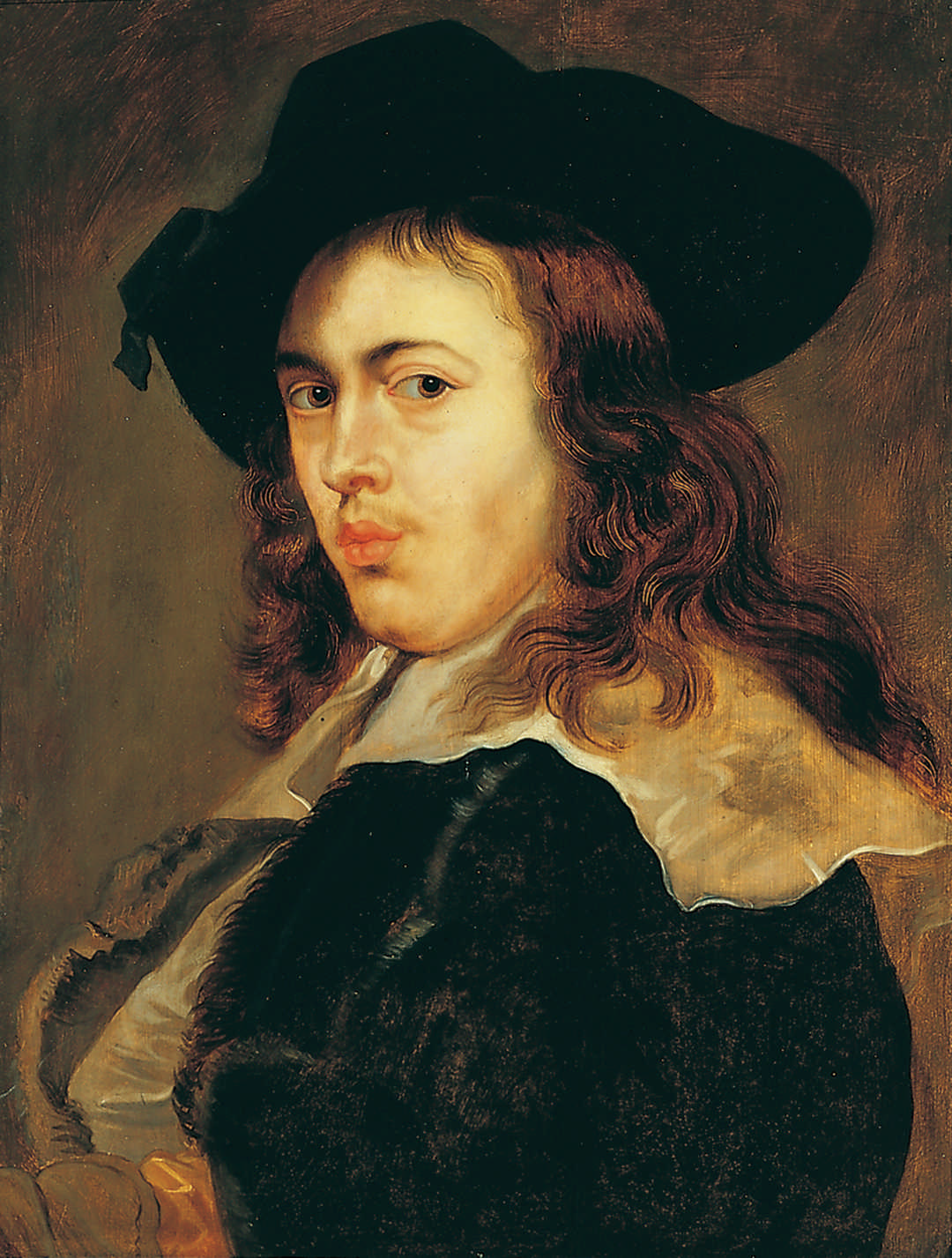
The Portrait of Nicolaas Rubens, c. 1634–1636, Mimara Museum

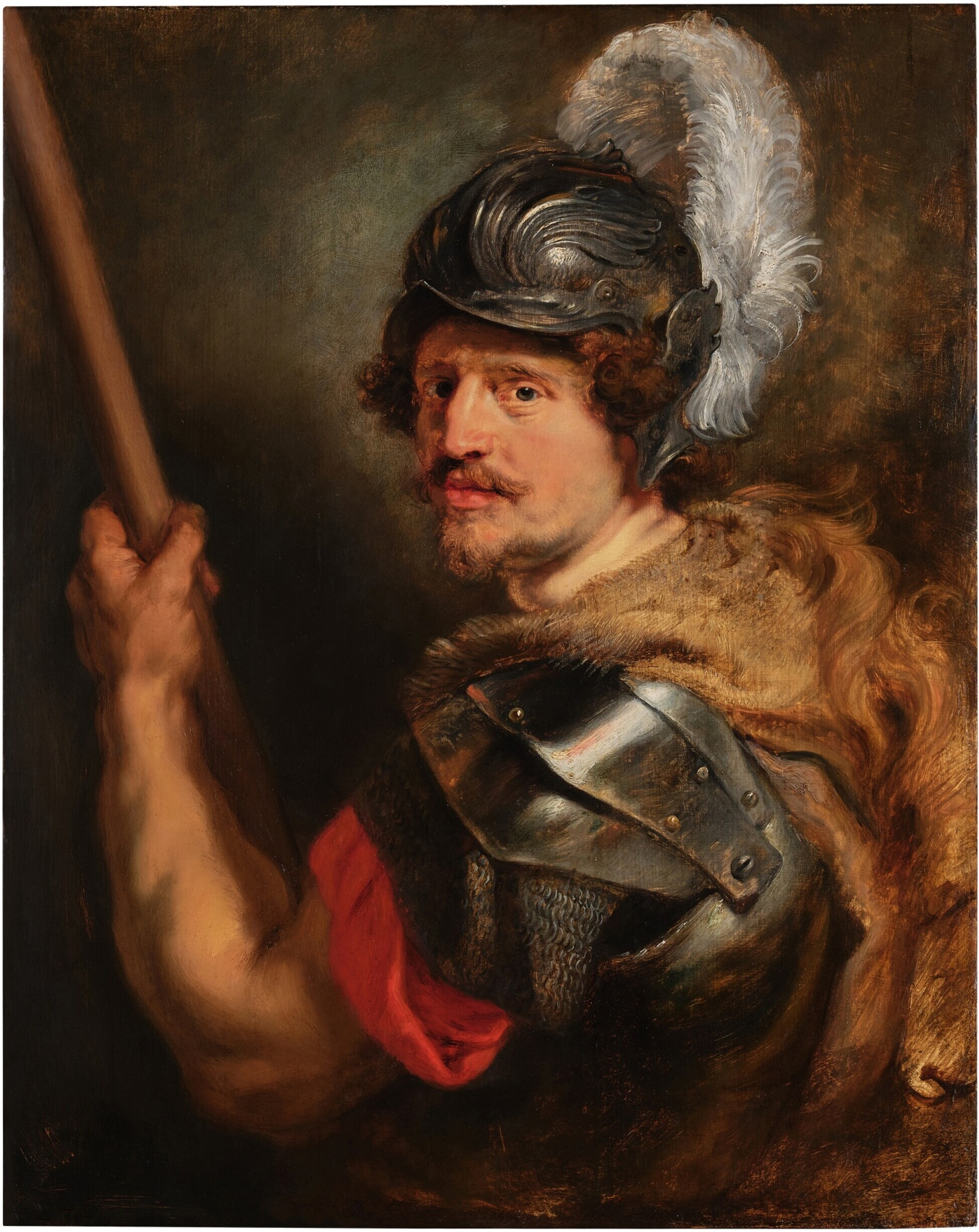
Portrait of a Man as Mars, 1620–1625, private collection
Landscapes

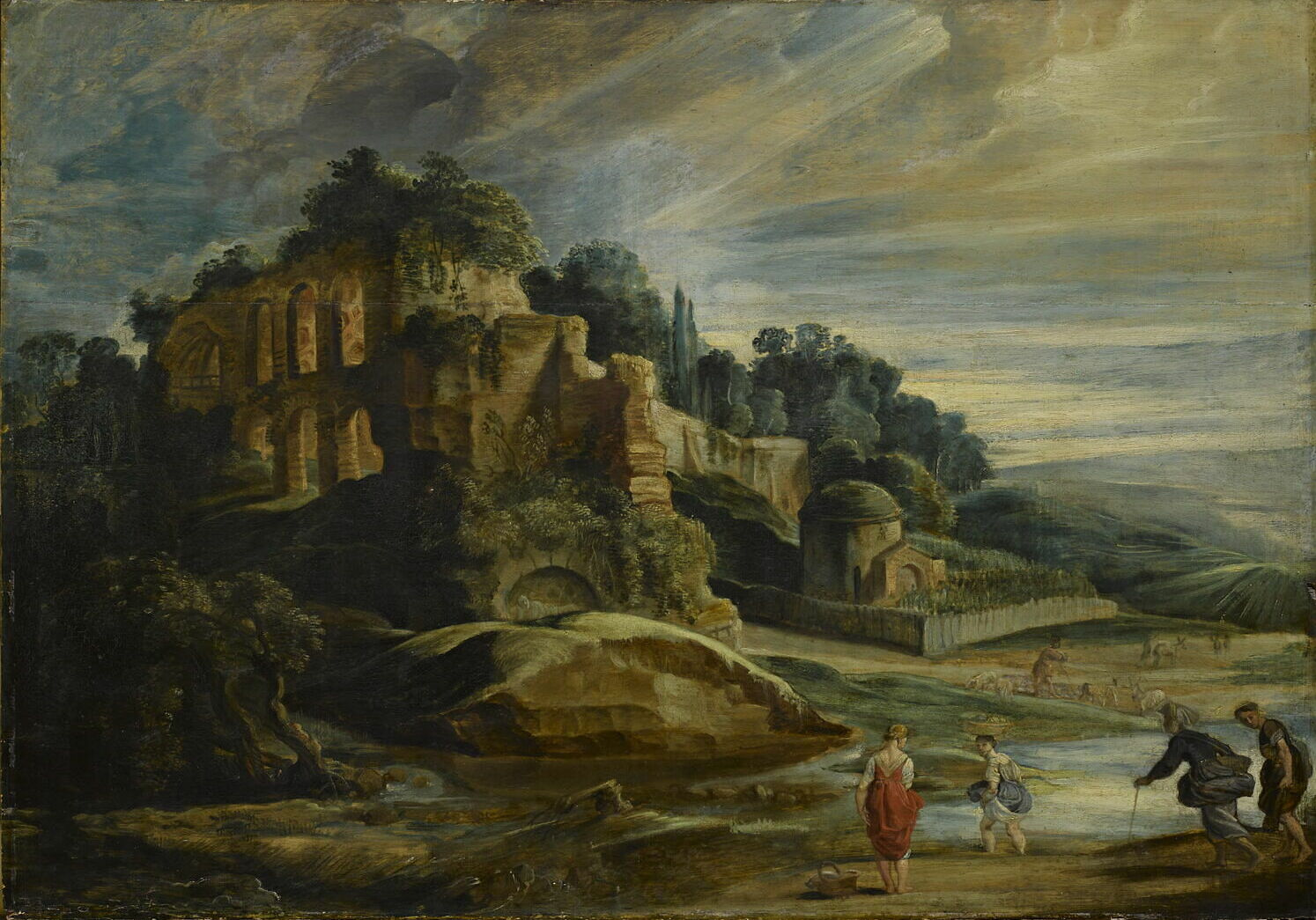
Landscape with the Ruins of Mount Palatine in Rome, 1615

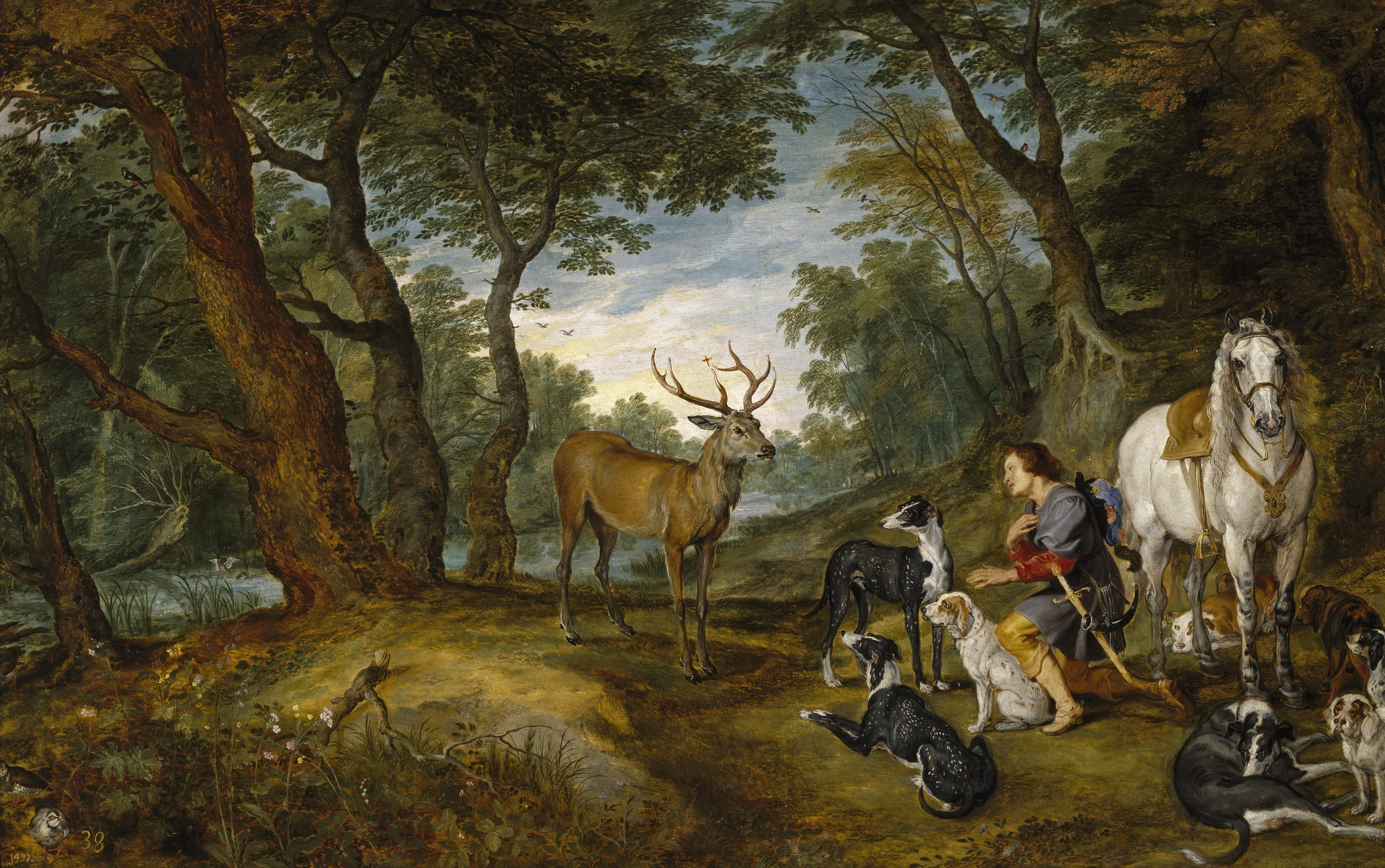
Miracle of Saint Hubert, painted together with Jan Bruegel, 1617

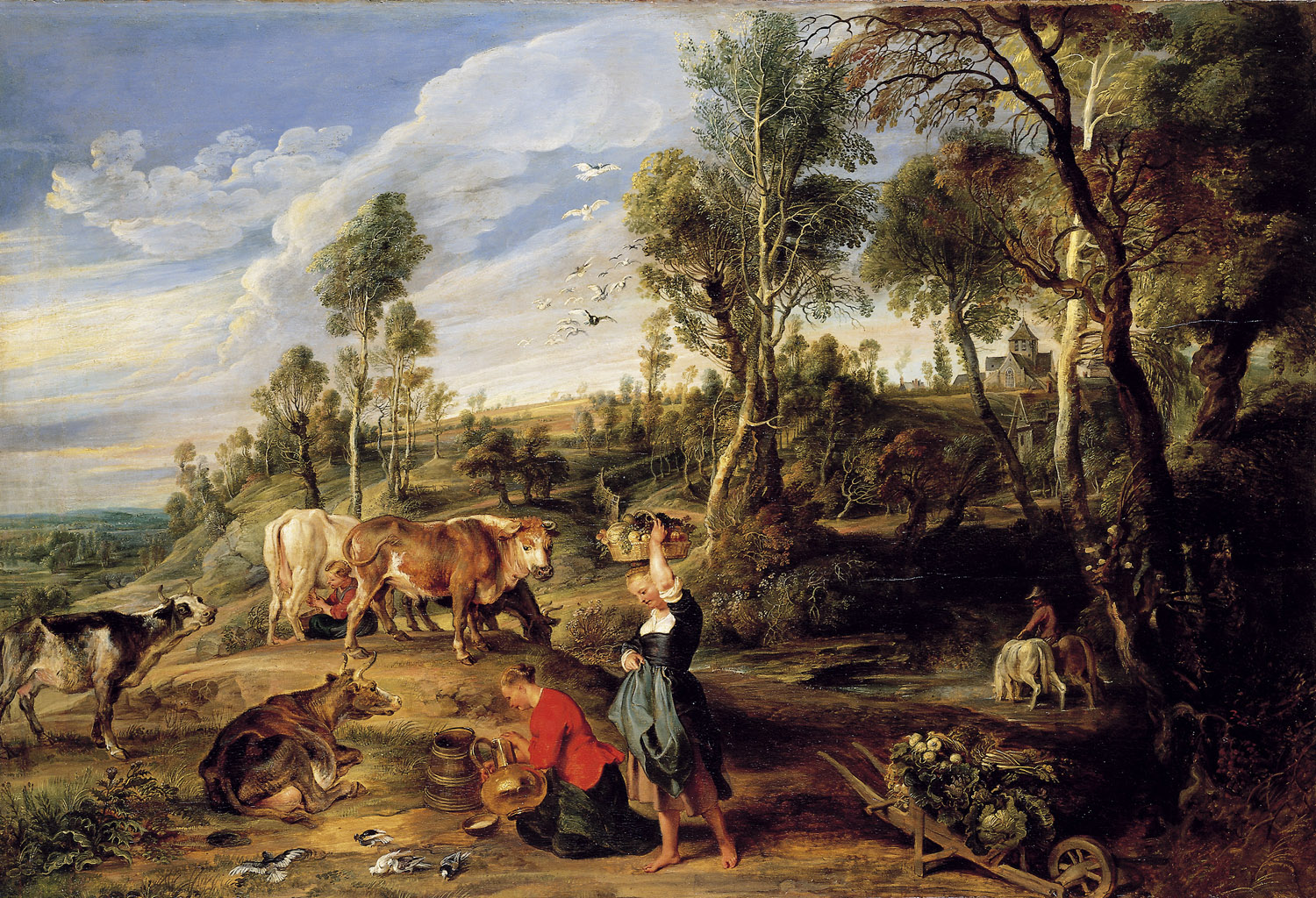
Landscape with Milkmaids and Cattle, 1618

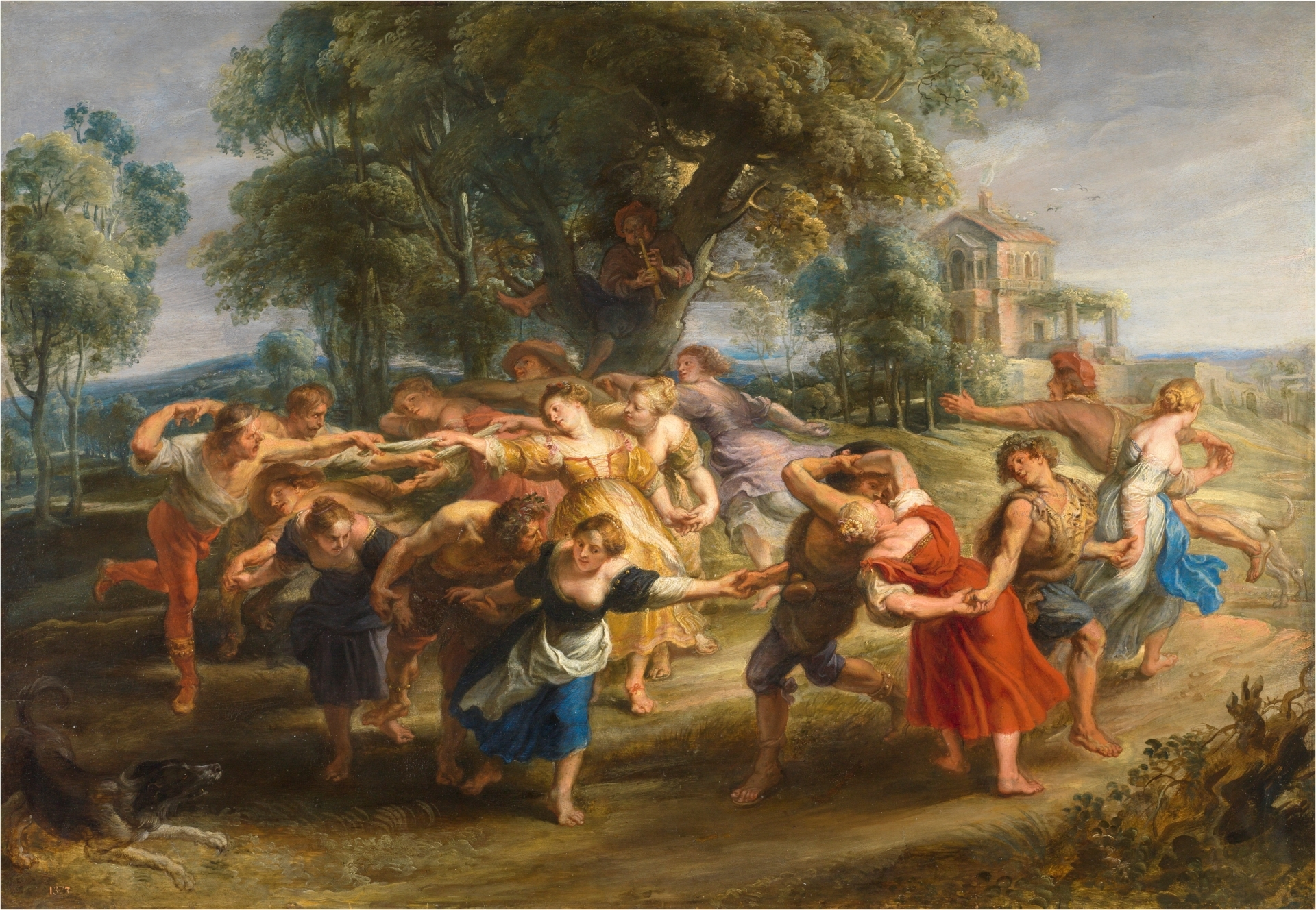
The Dance of the Villagers, c. 1635, Museo del Prado

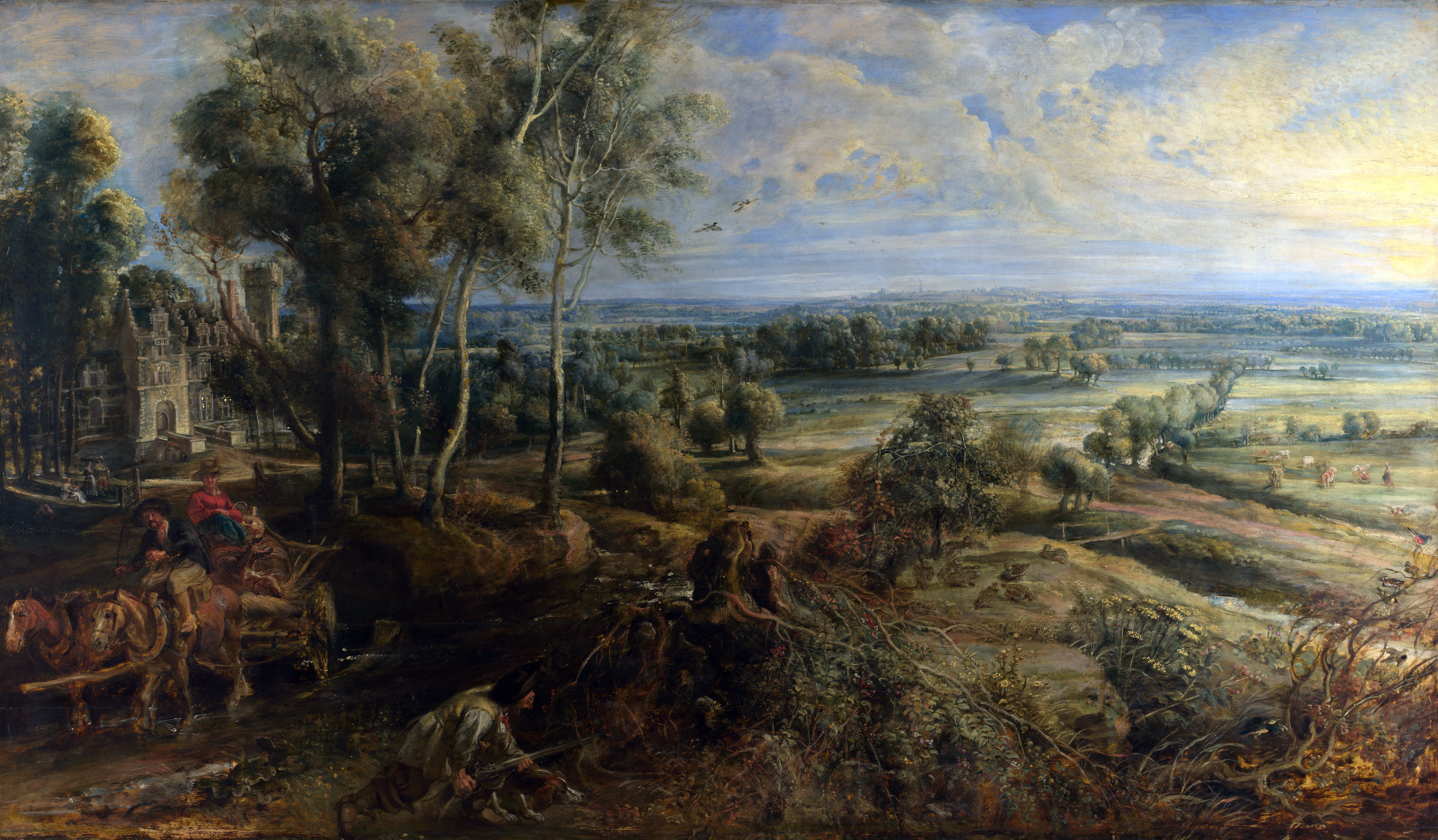
A View of Het Steen in the Early Morning, c. 1635–1638, National Gallery London

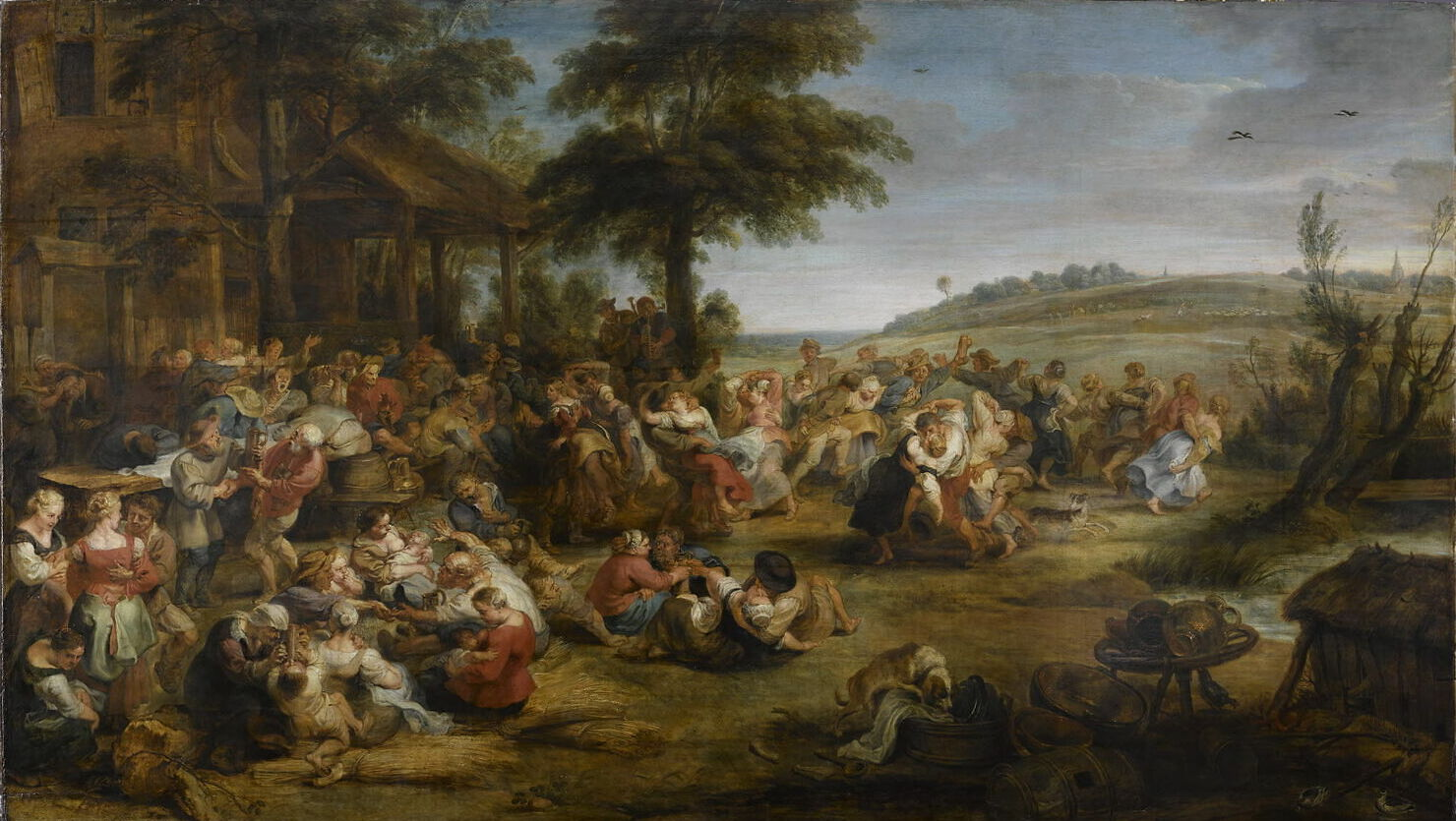
Feasting and dancing peasants, c. 1636, Louvre
Mythological

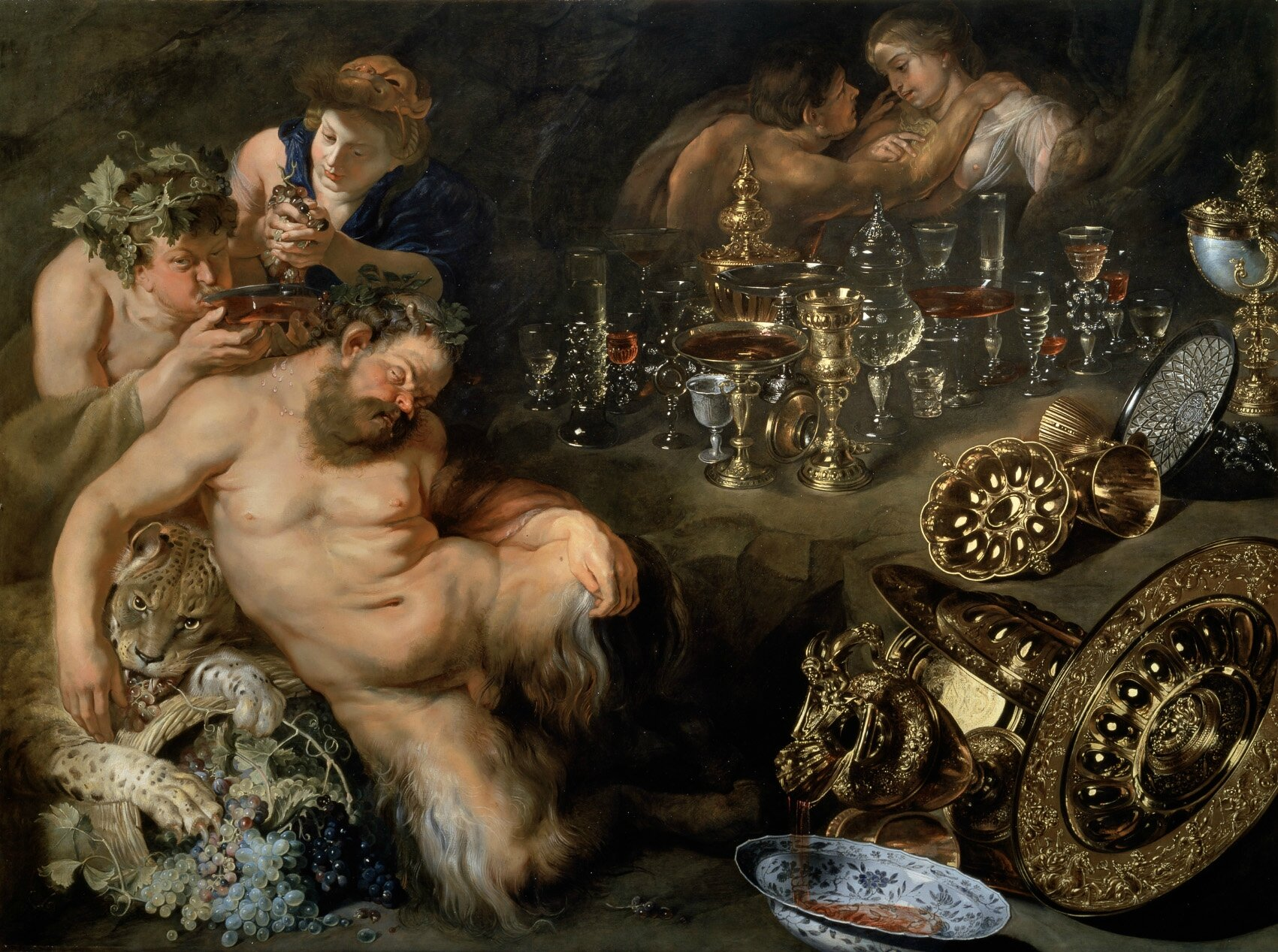
Sleeping Silenus, collaboration with David Rijckaert II, c. 1611, Academy of Fine Arts Vienna

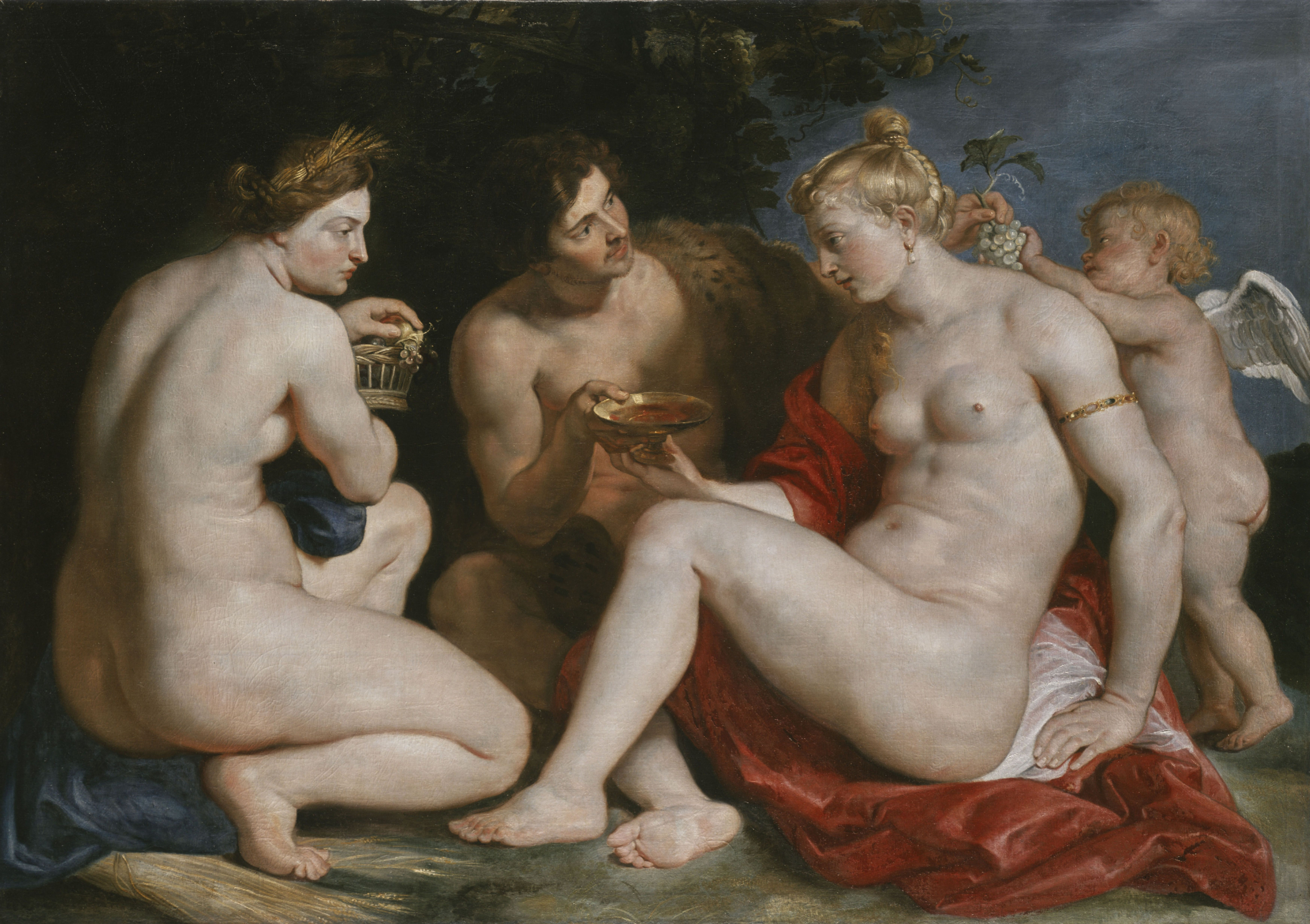
Venus, Cupid, Bacchus and Ceres, 1612

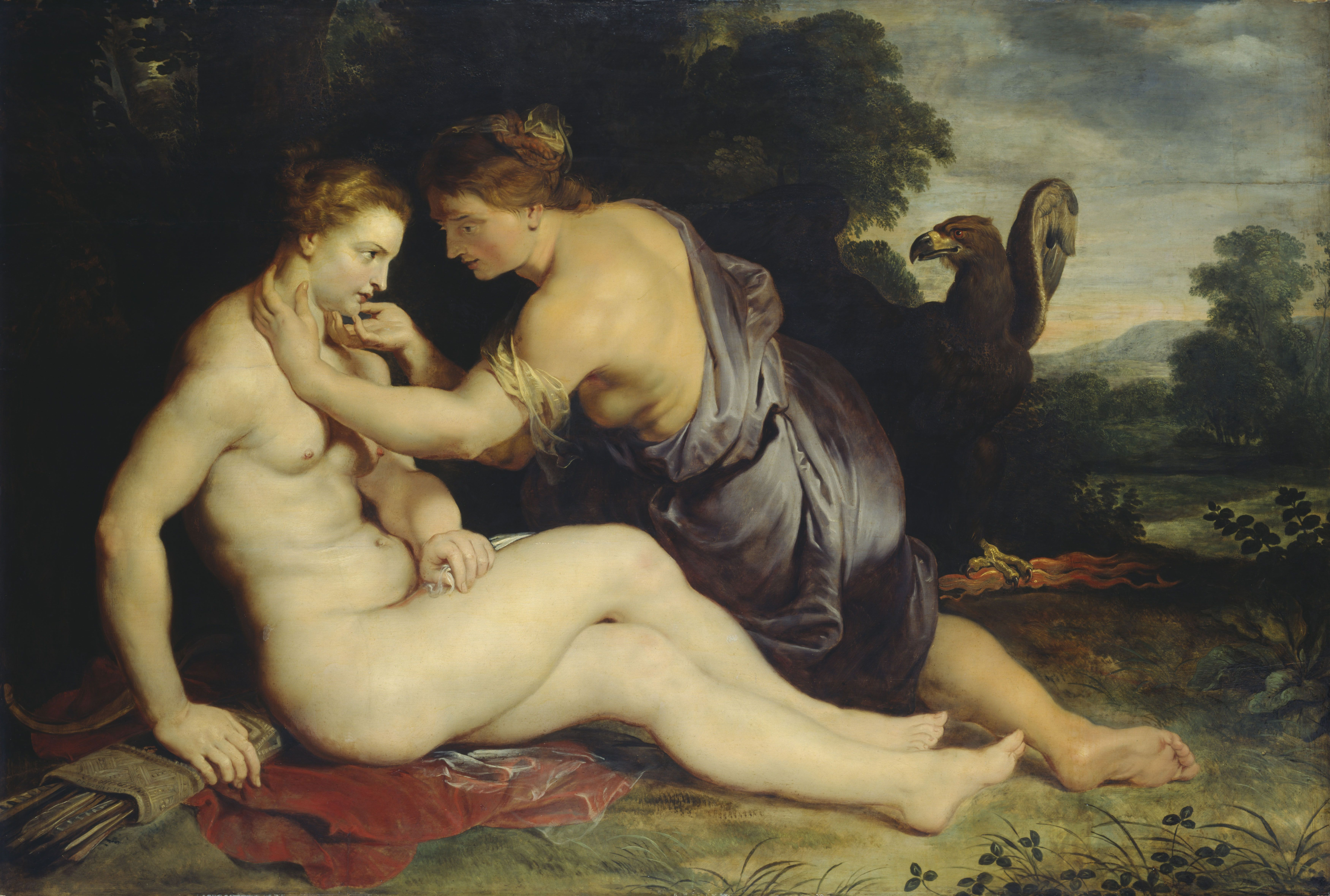
Jupiter and Callisto, 1613, Museumslandschaft Hessen Kassel

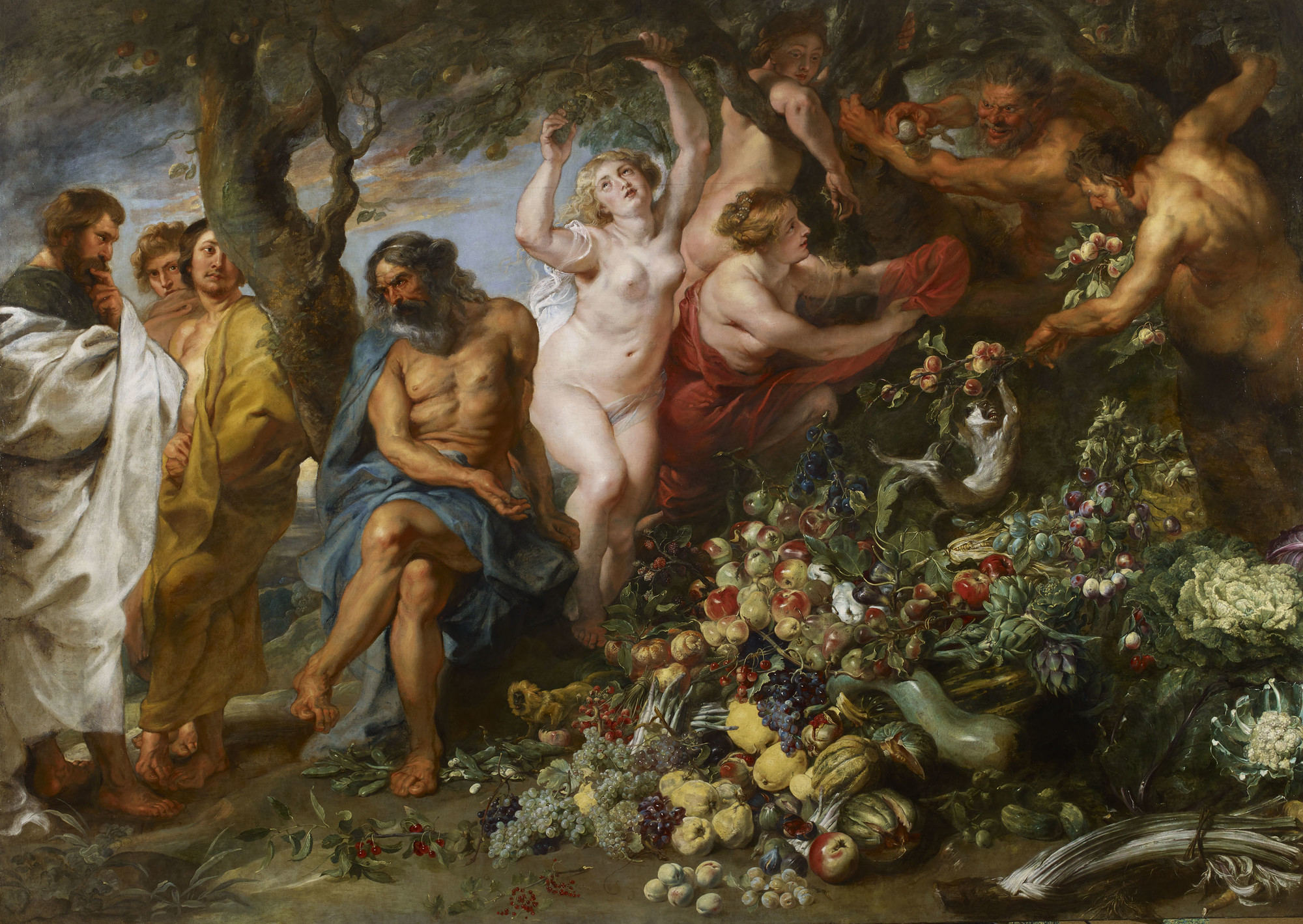
Pythagoras Advocating Vegetarianism, 1618–1630, by Rubens and Frans Snyders, inspired by Pythagoras's speech in Ovid's Metamorphoses, Royal Collection

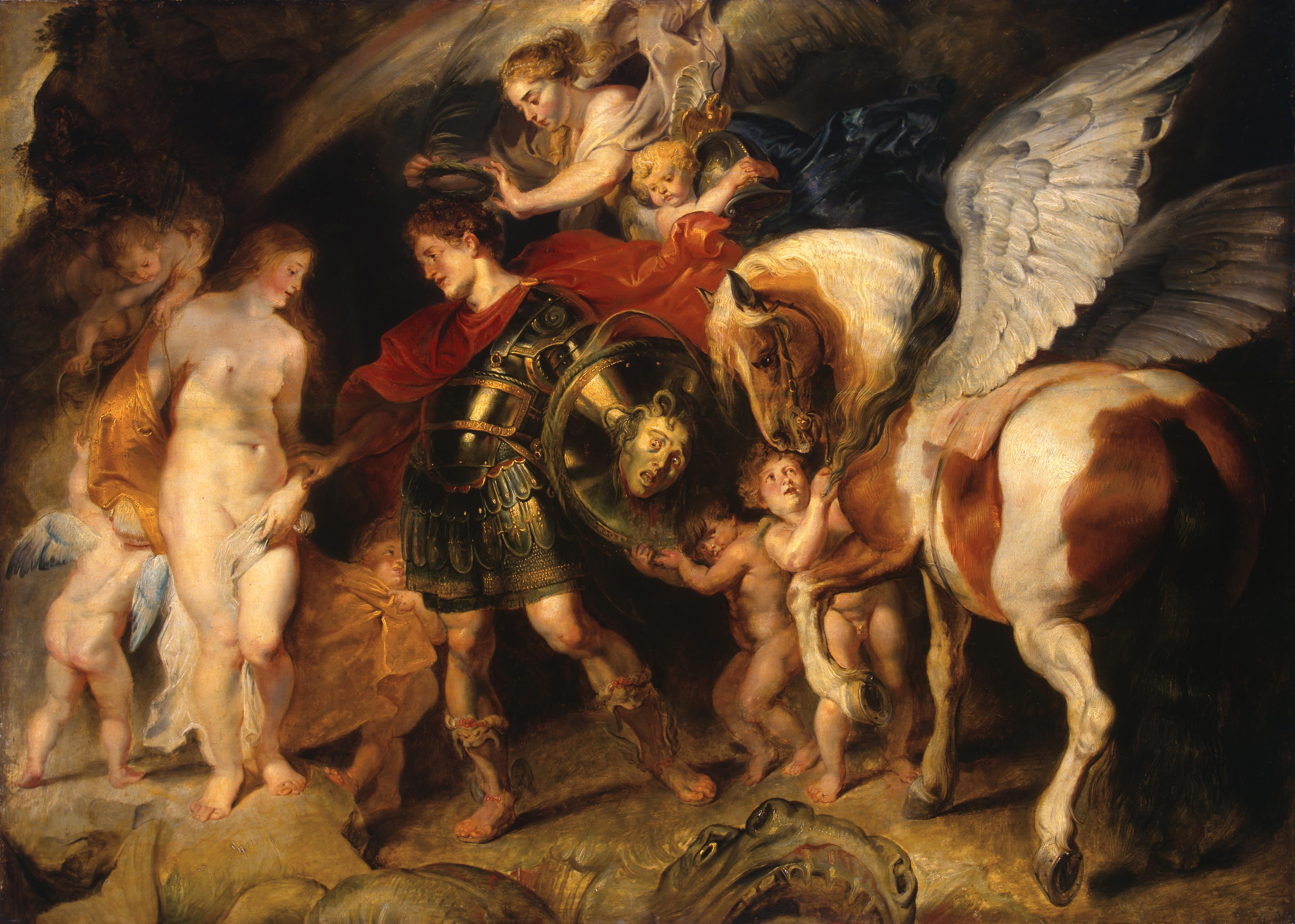
Perseus and Andromeda, c. 1622, Hermitage Museum, Saint Petersburg

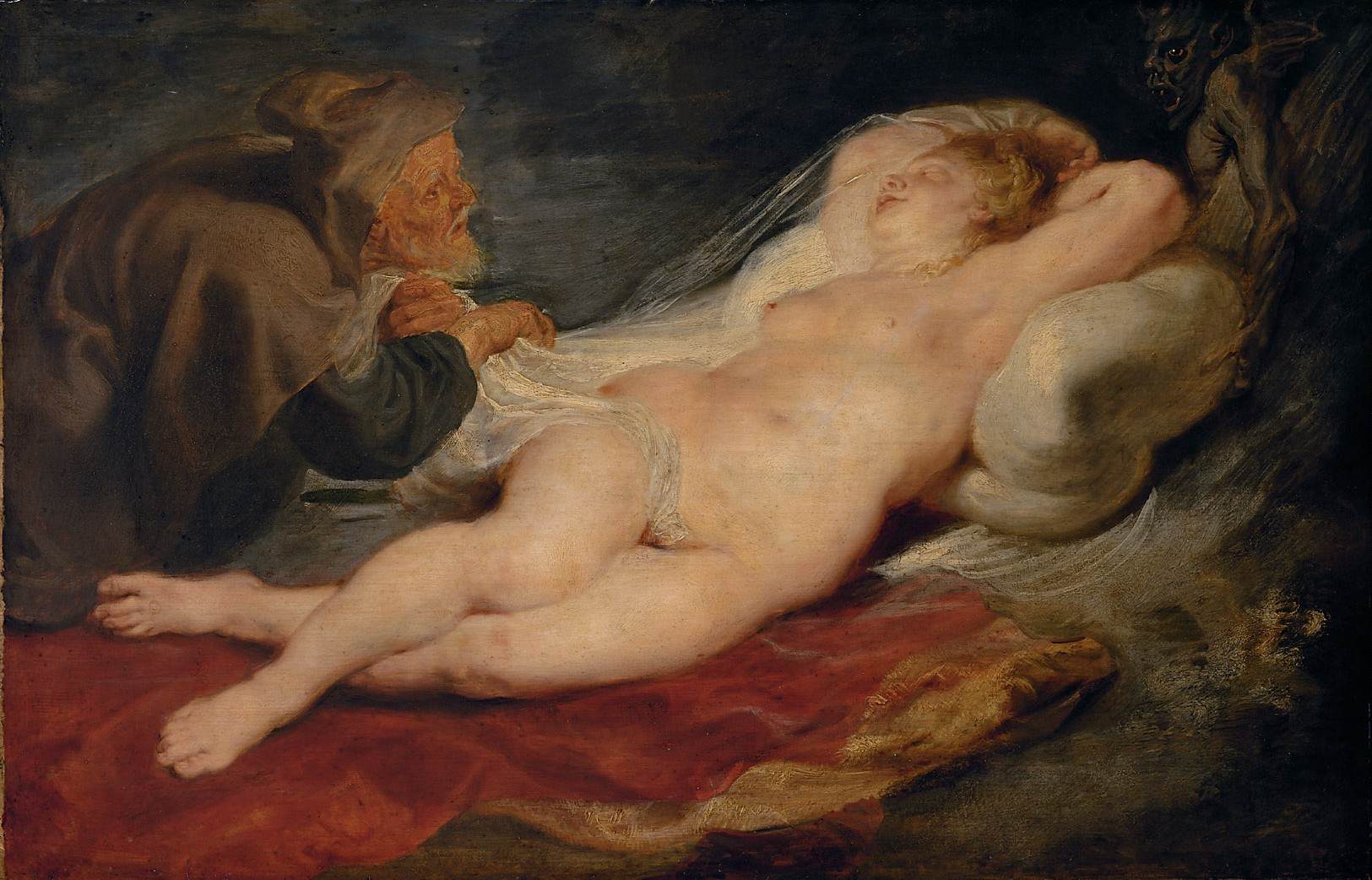
Ermit and sleeping Angelica, 1628

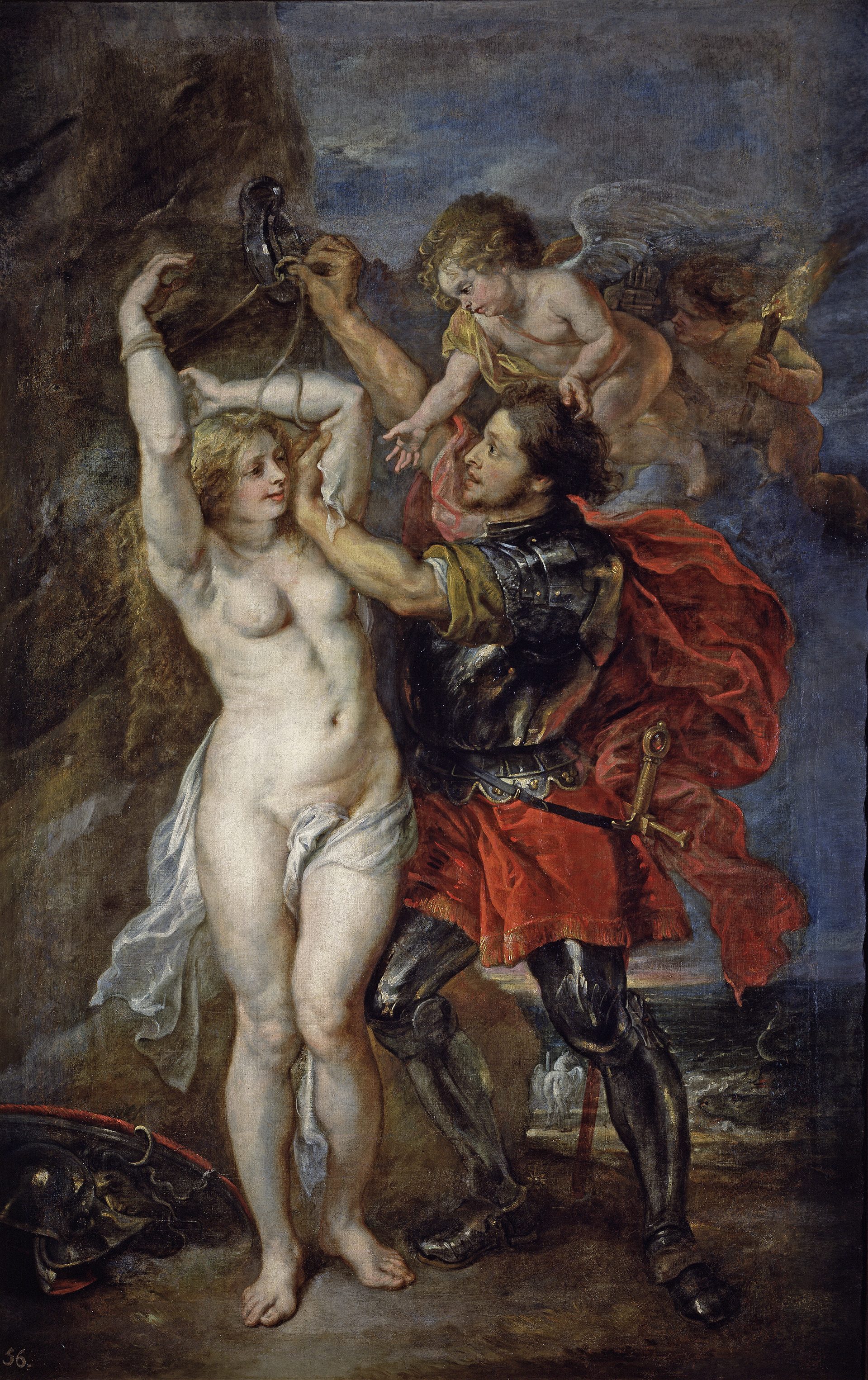
Perseus Liberating Andromeda, 1639–40, Museo del Prado

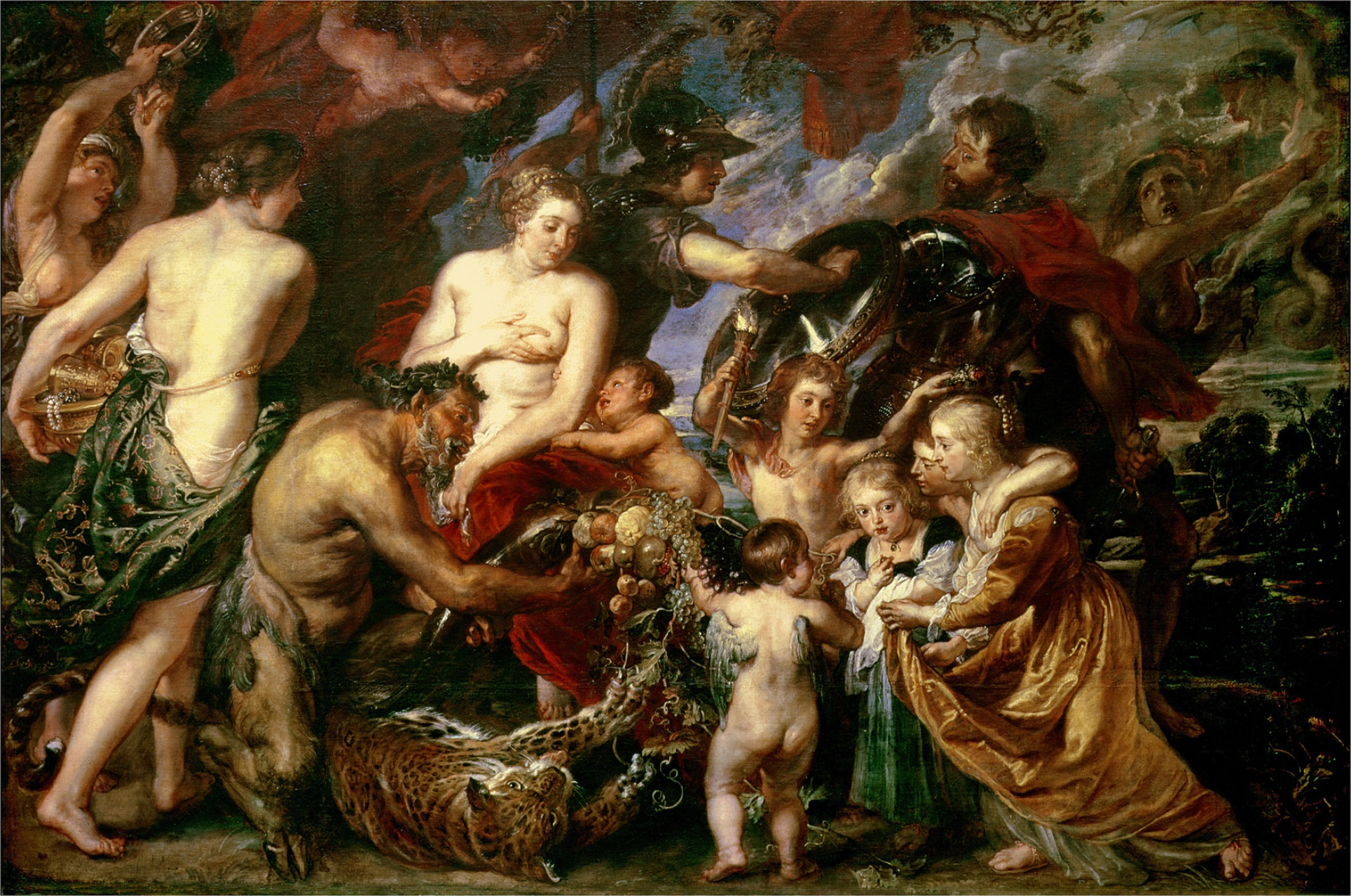
Minerva Protecting Peace from Mars, 1629–1630, National Gallery London

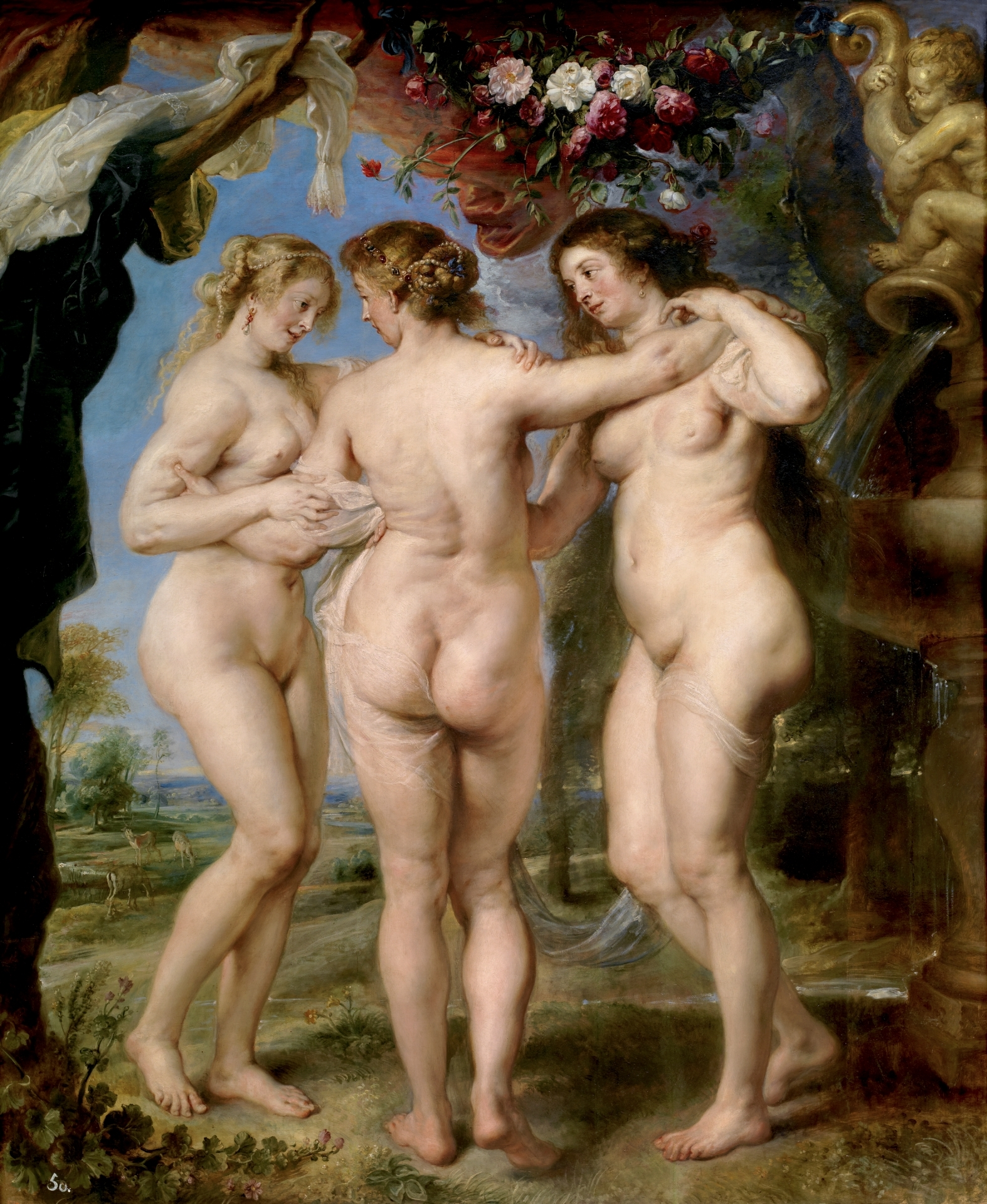
The Three Graces, 1635, Museo del Prado

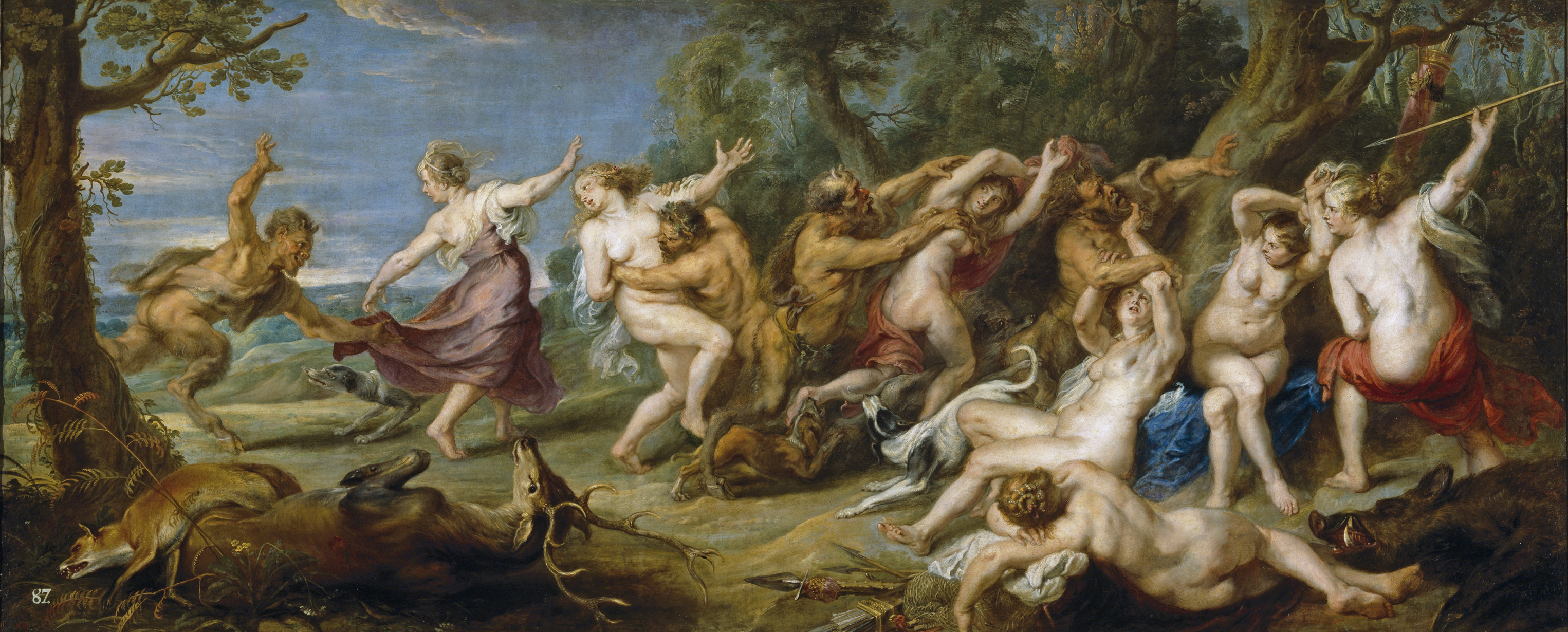
Diana and her Nymphs surprised by the Fauns, c. 1639–40, Museo del Prado

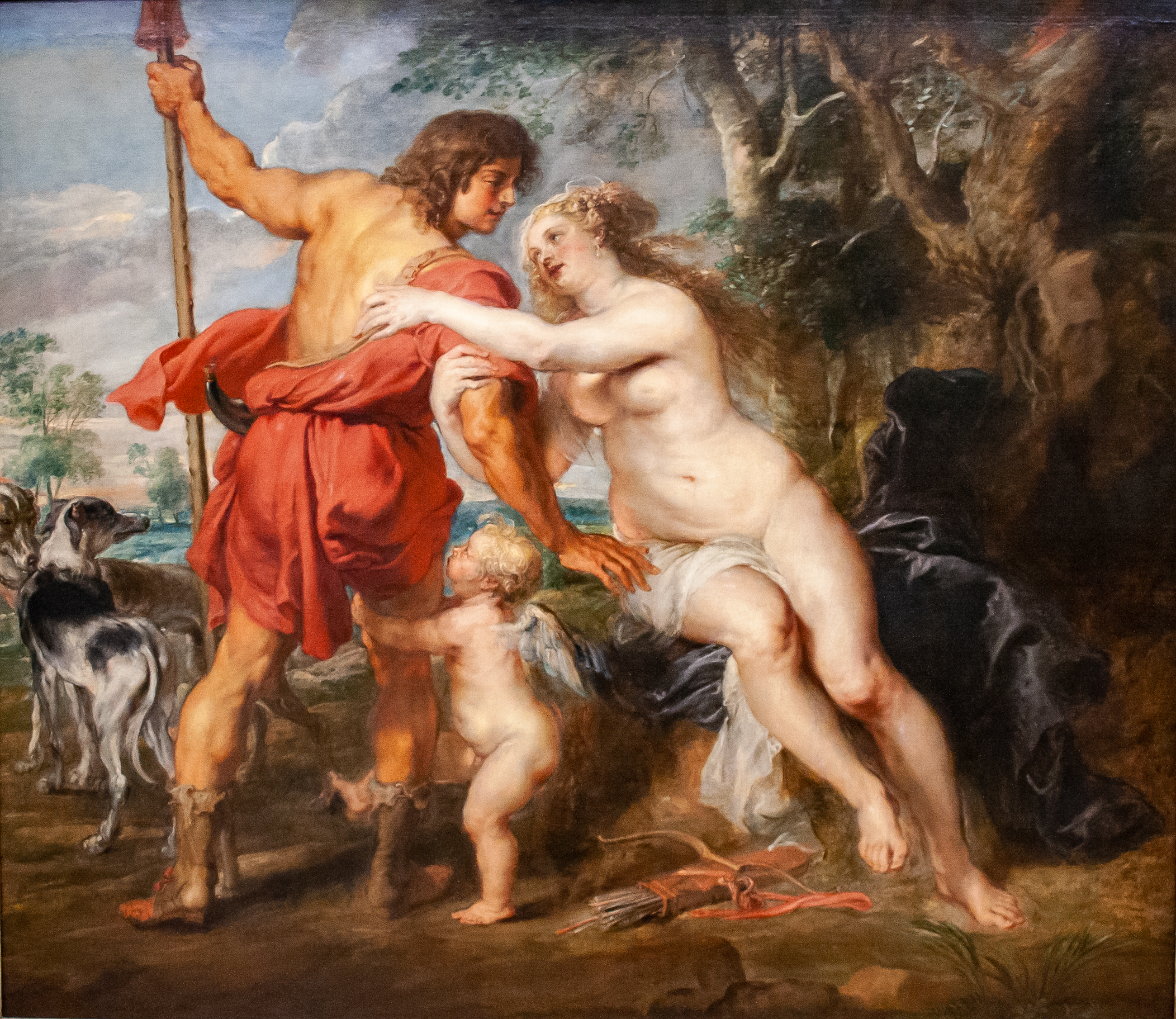
Venus and Adonis, 1635–1638, Metropolitan Museum of Art

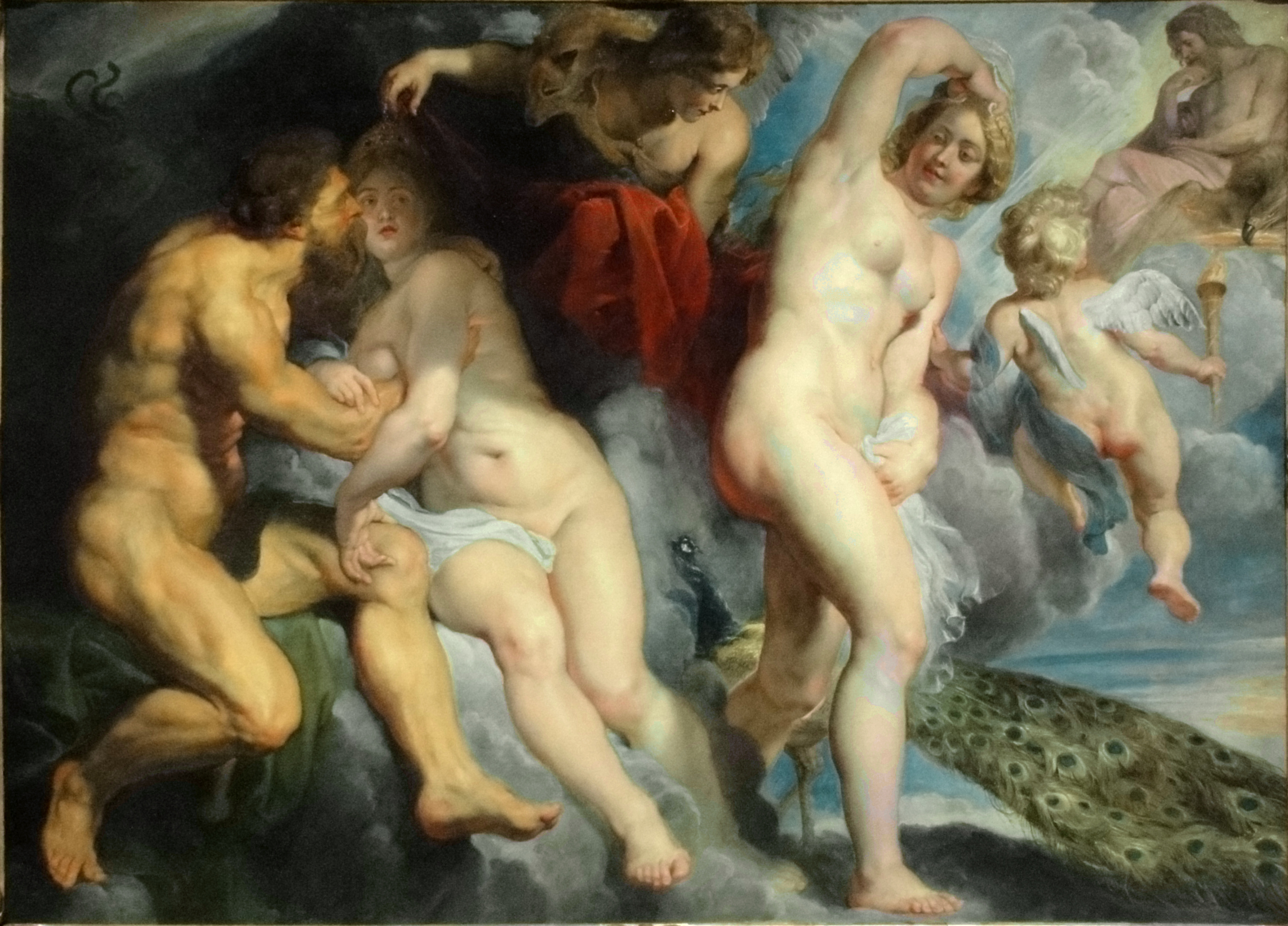
King Ixion fooled by Juno, whom he wanted to seduce, Louvre
Helena Fourment and related pictures

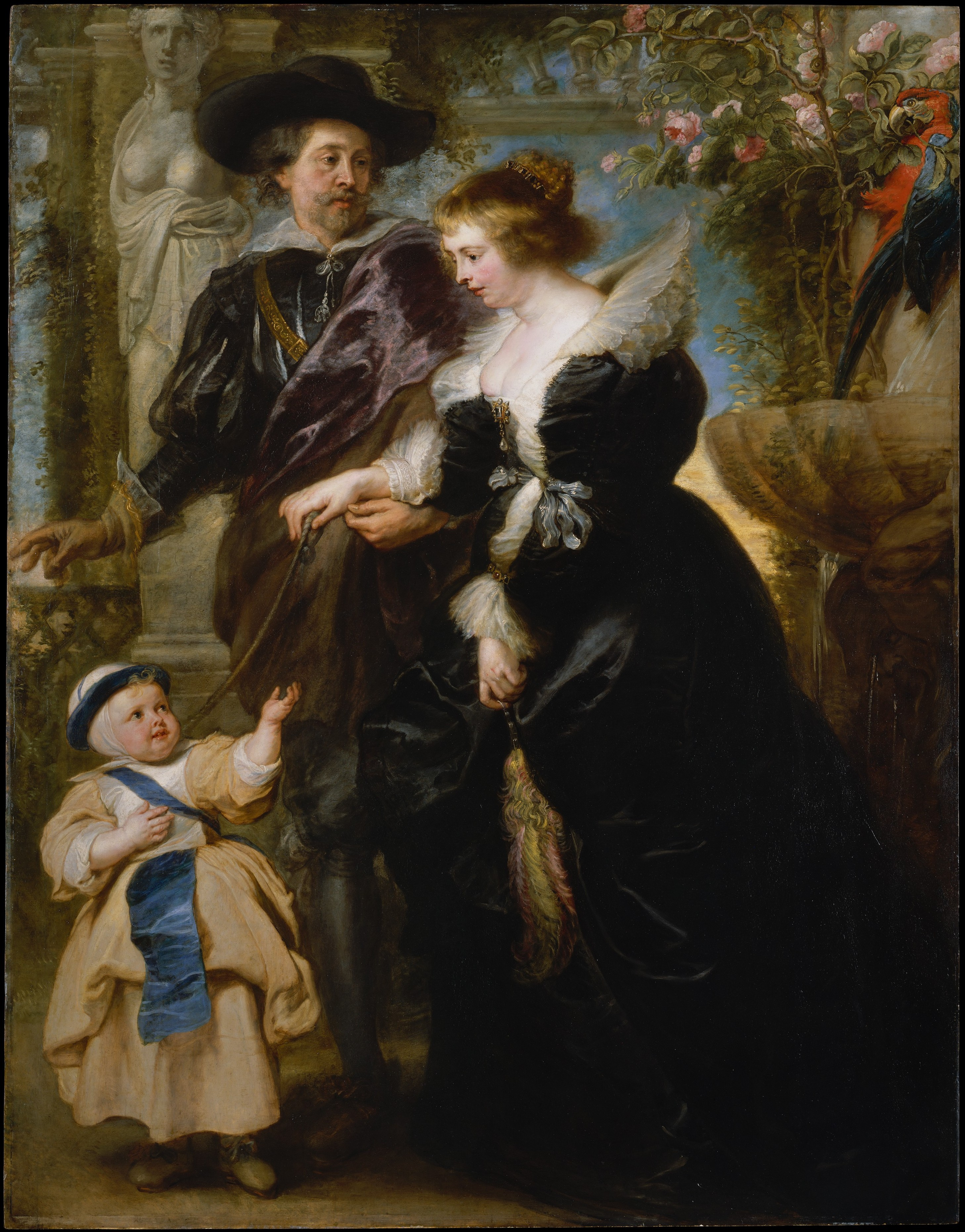
Rubens with Helena Fourment and their Son Peter Paul, 1639, Metropolitan Museum of Art

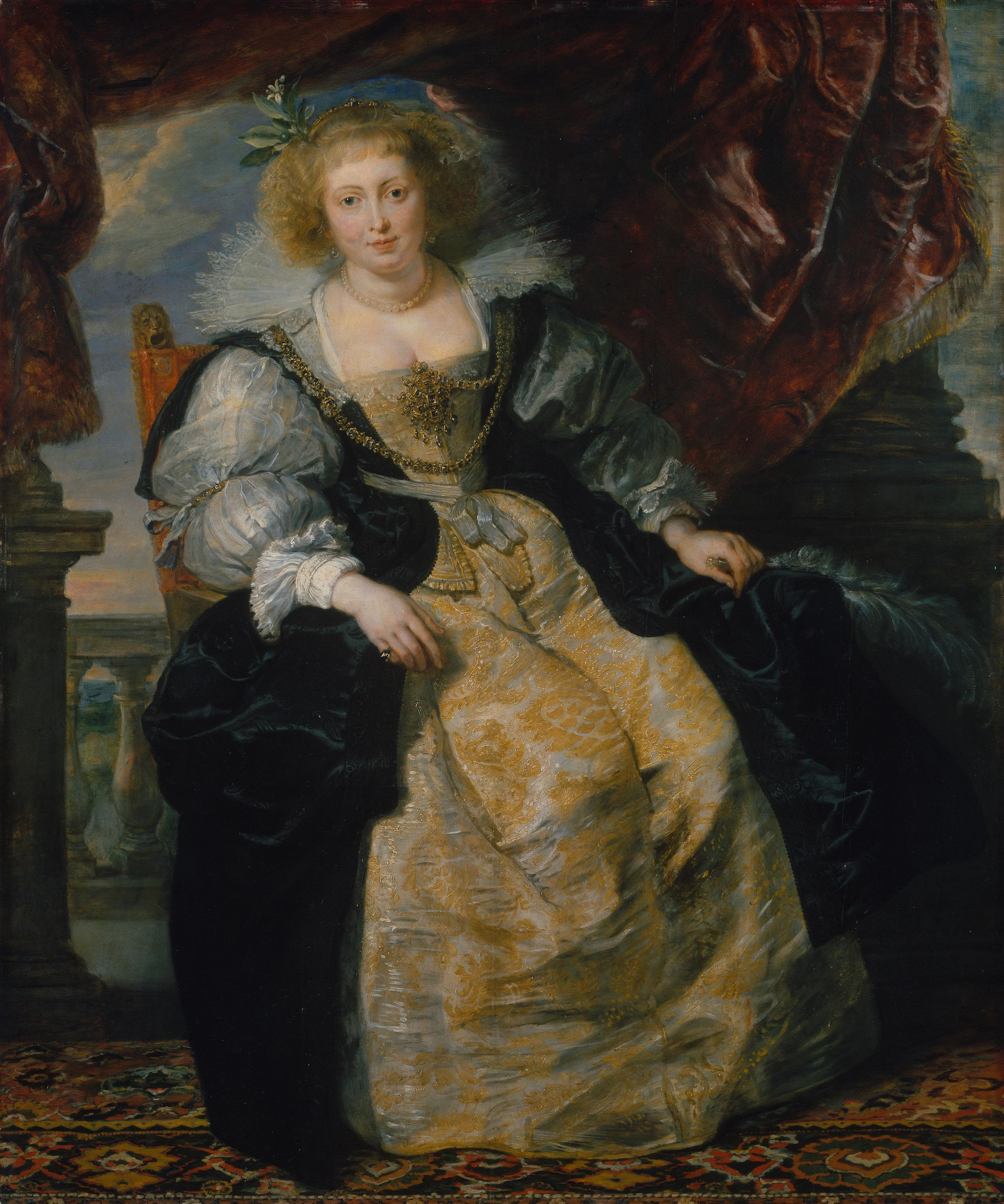
Helena Fourment in Wedding Dress, c. 1630, Alte Pinakothek

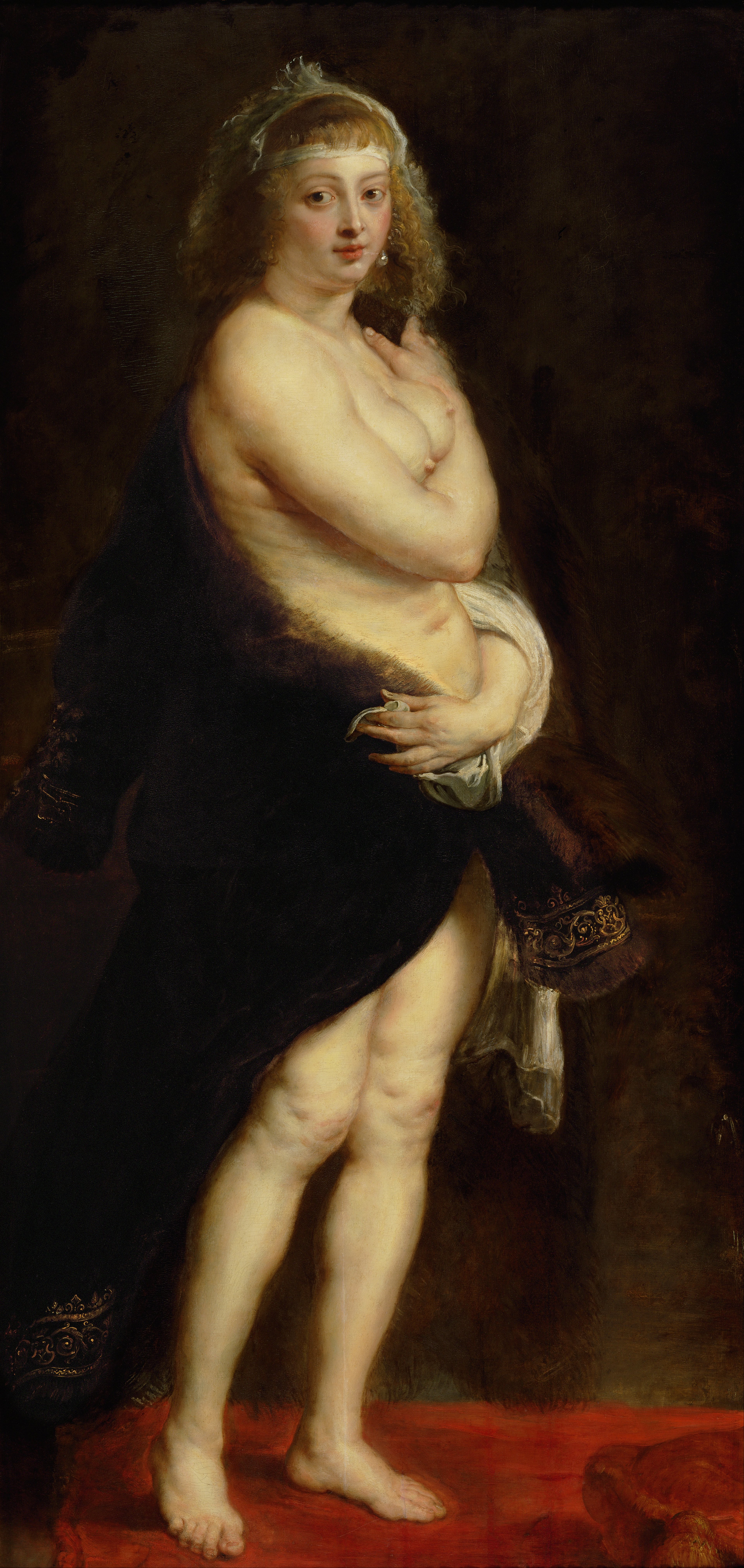
Helena Fourment in a Fur Wrap, also known as Het Pelsken, 1636–1638, Kunsthistorisches Museum

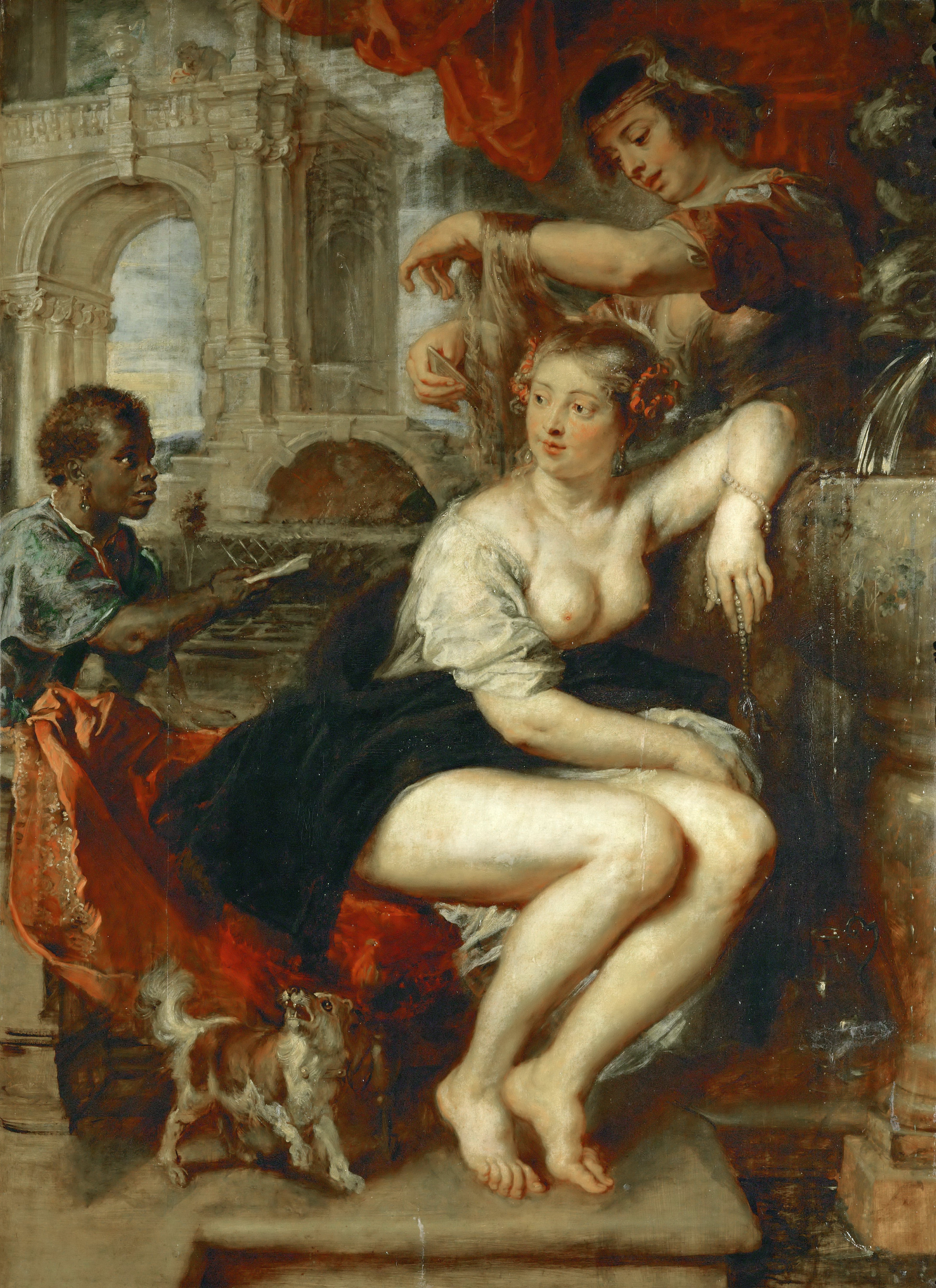
Bathsheba at the Fountain, c. 1635, Gemäldegalerie Alte Meister

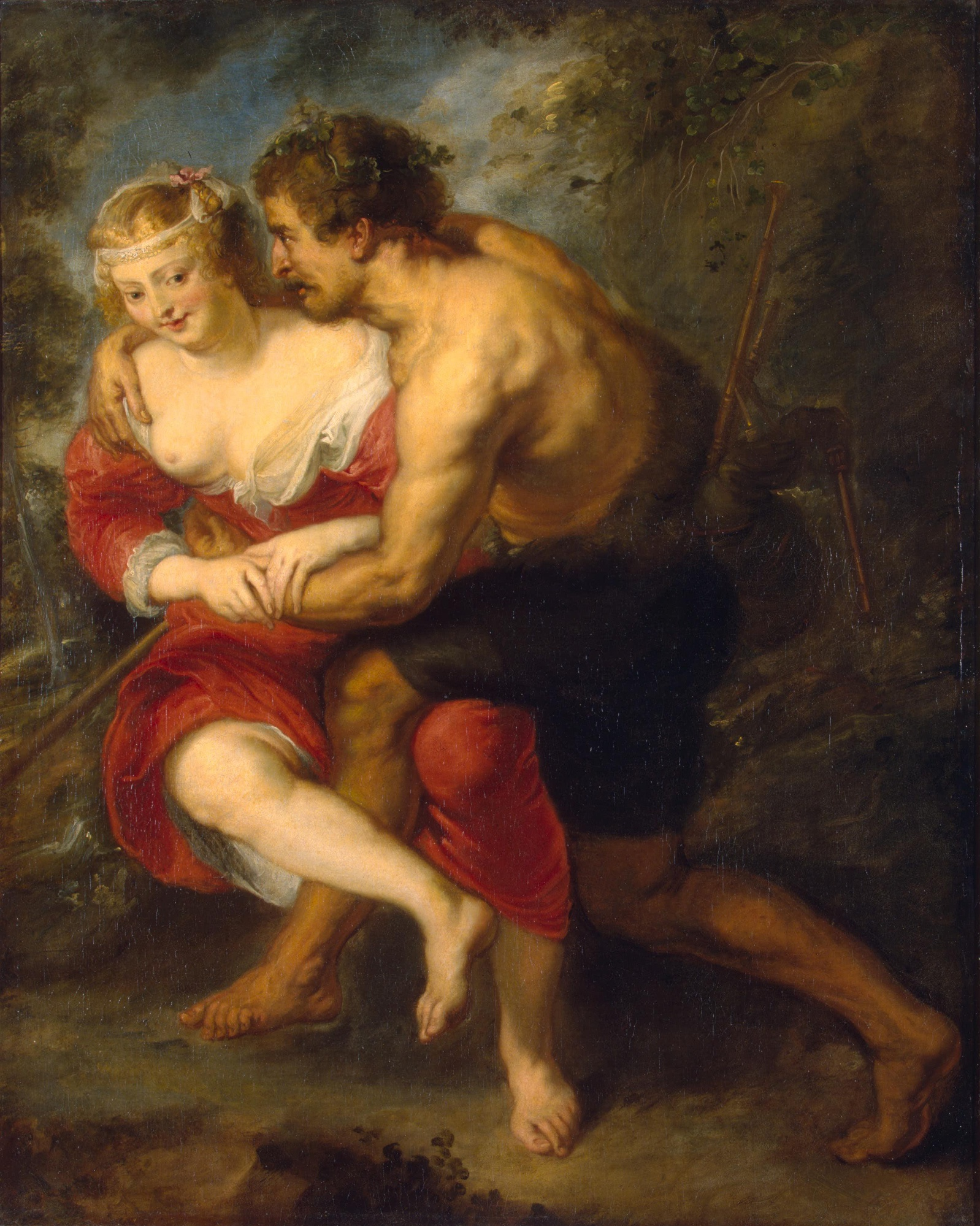
Pastoral Scene, c. 1637, Hermitage Museum

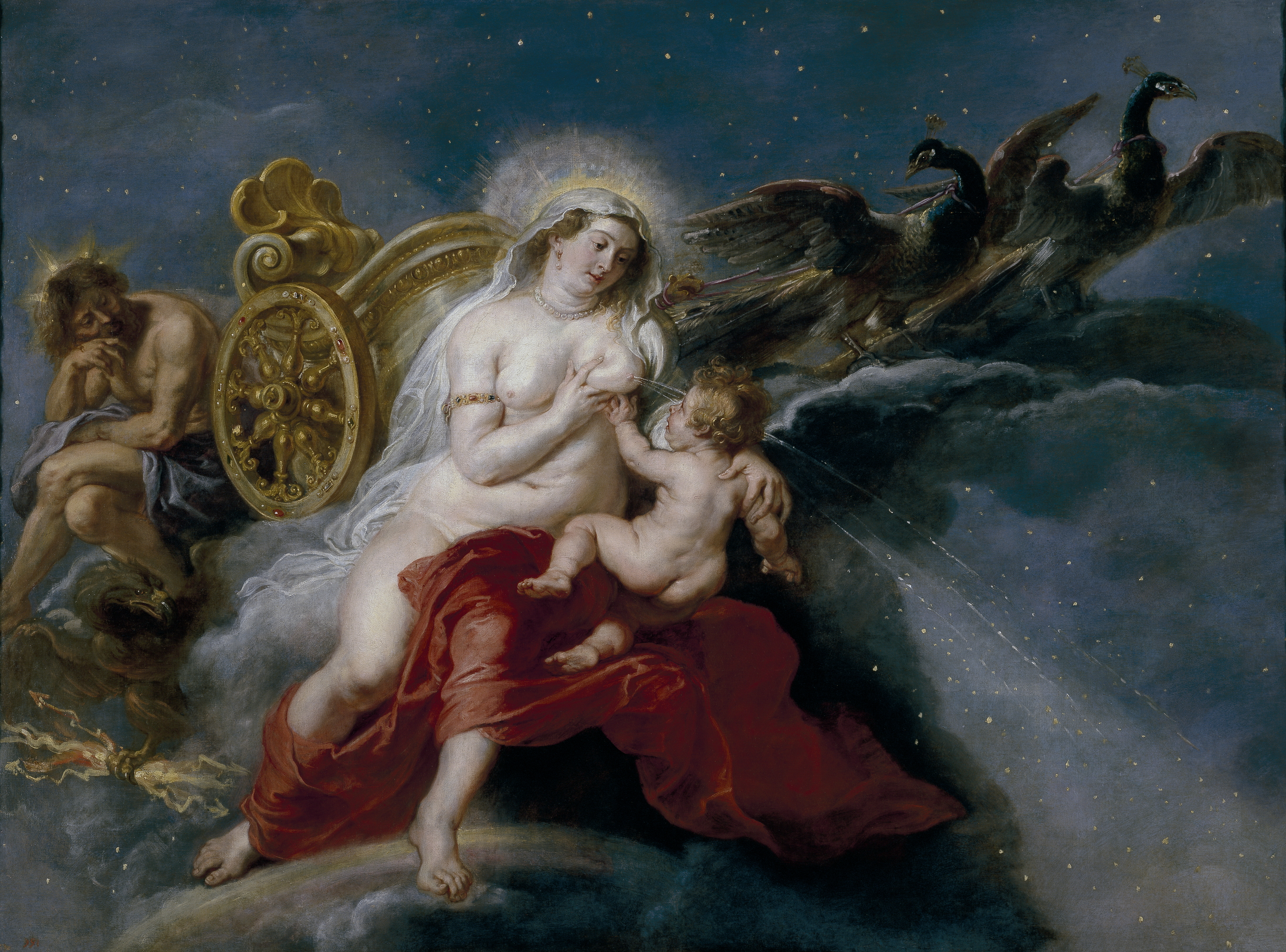
The Birth of the Milky Way, 1636, Museo del Prado
Biblical Scenes

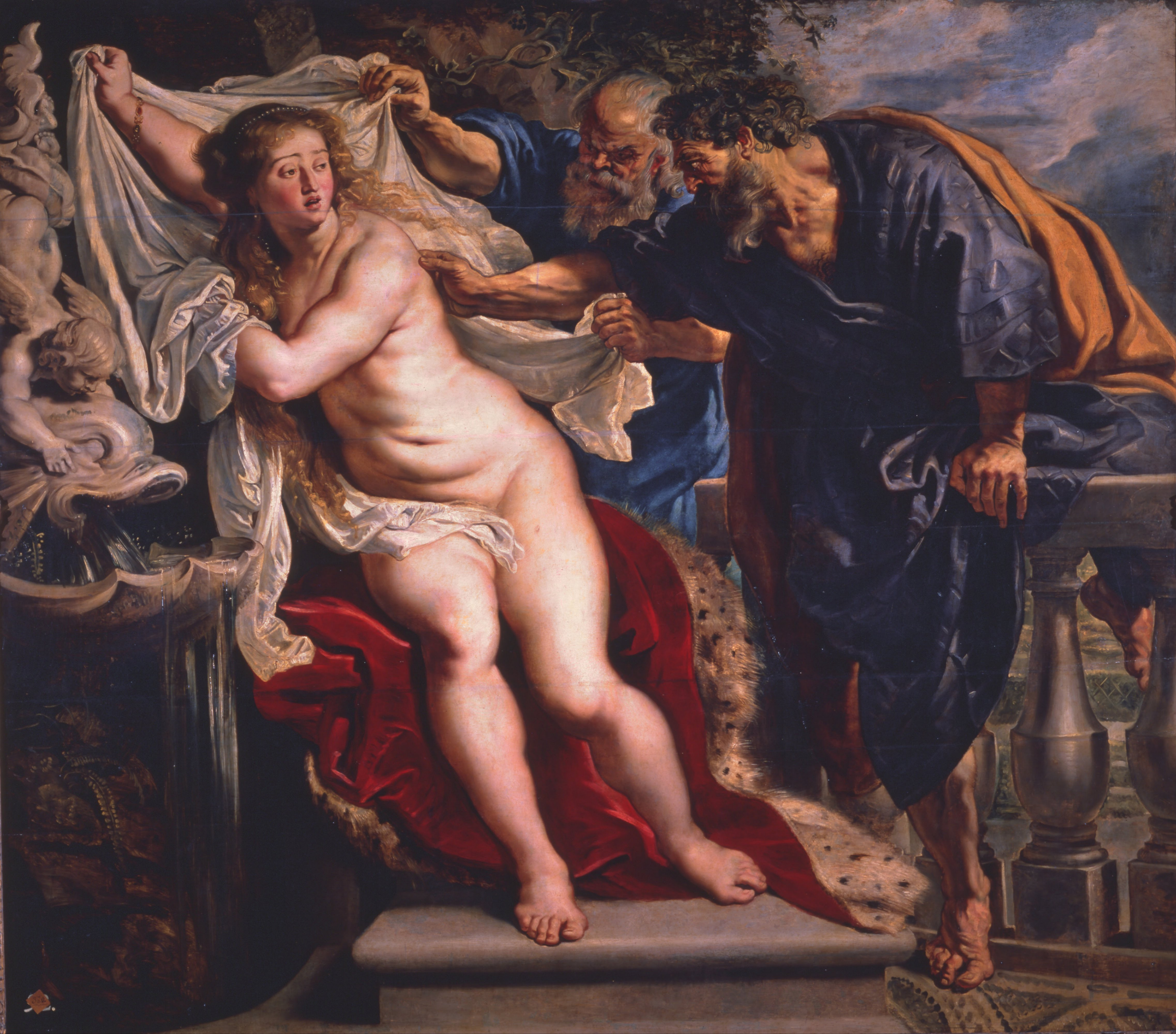
Susanna and the Elders, 1609–1610, Real Academia de Bellas Artes de San Fernando

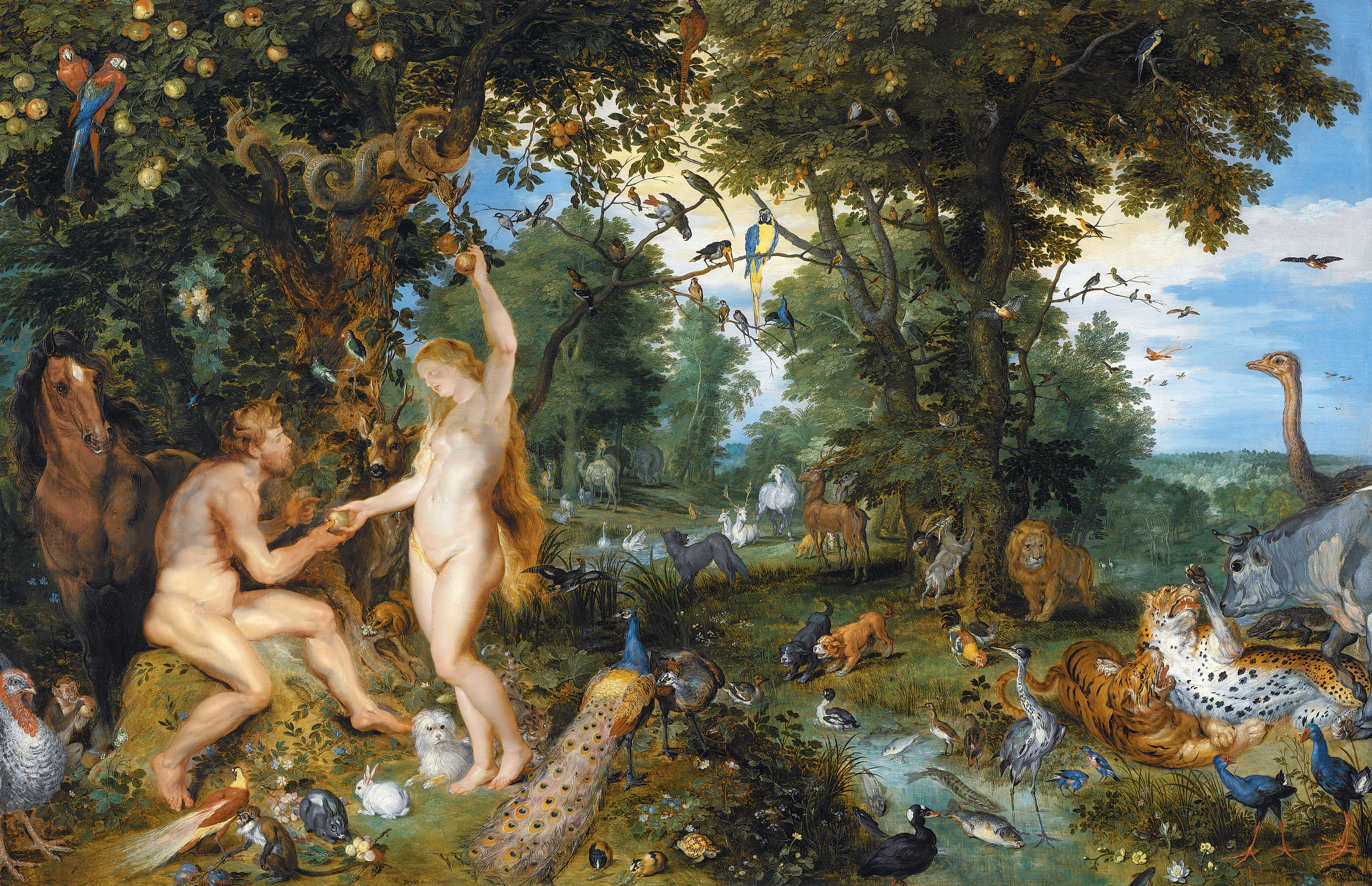
Jan Brueghel the Elder and Peter Paul Rubens, The Garden of Eden with the Fall of Man, Mauritshuis, The Hague

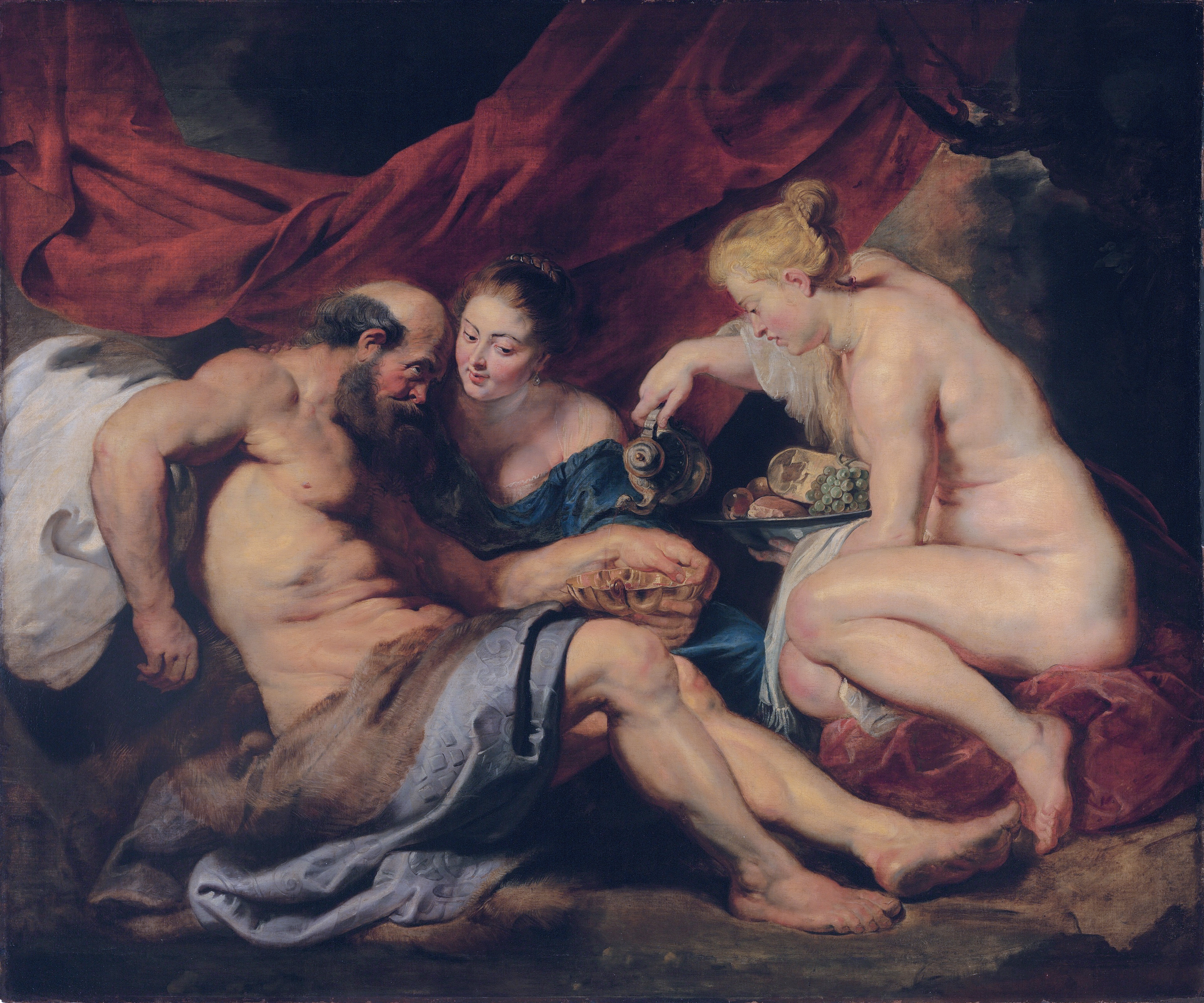
Lot and His Daughters, c. 1613–14

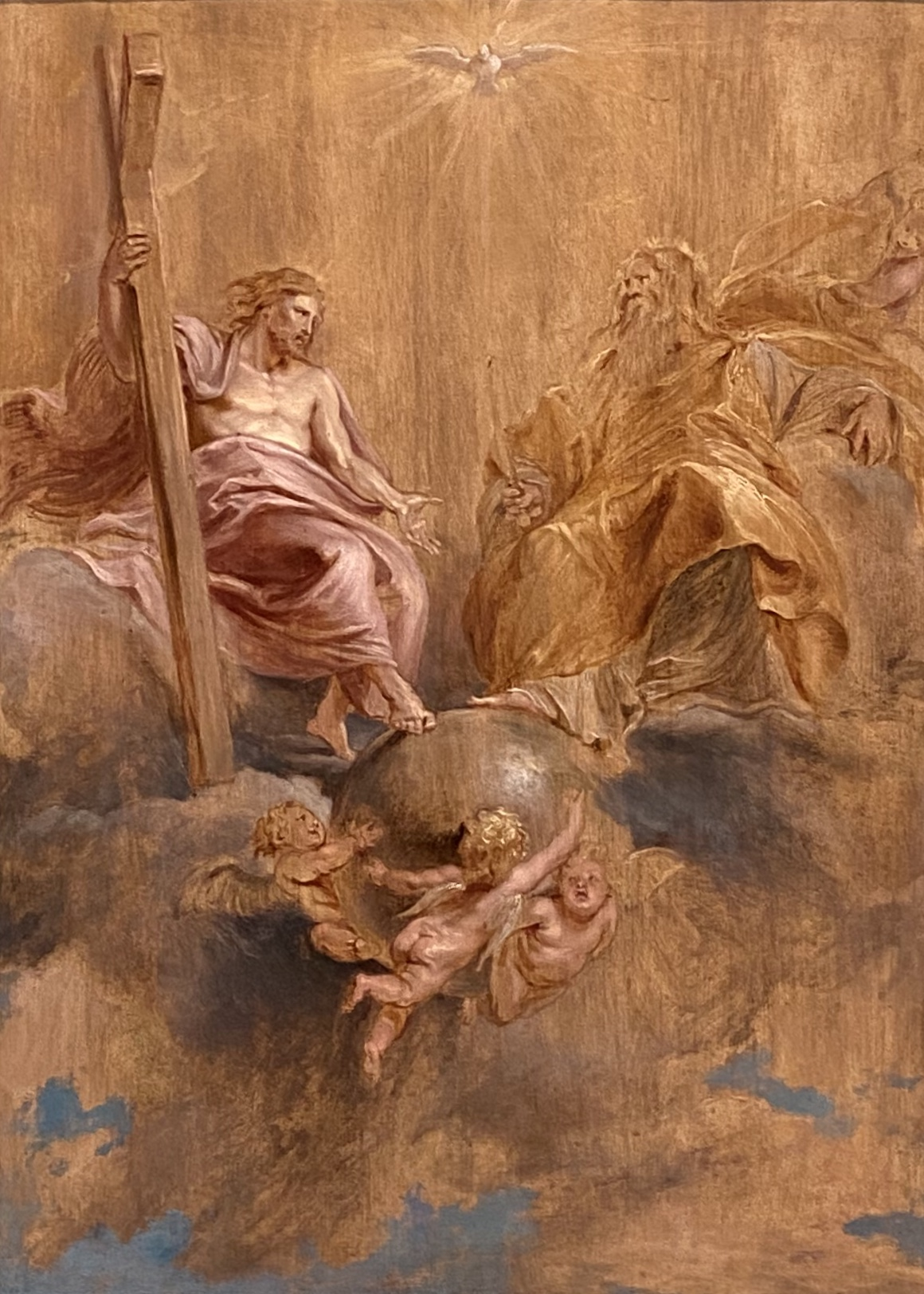
The Holy Trinity, Kunstmuseum Basel

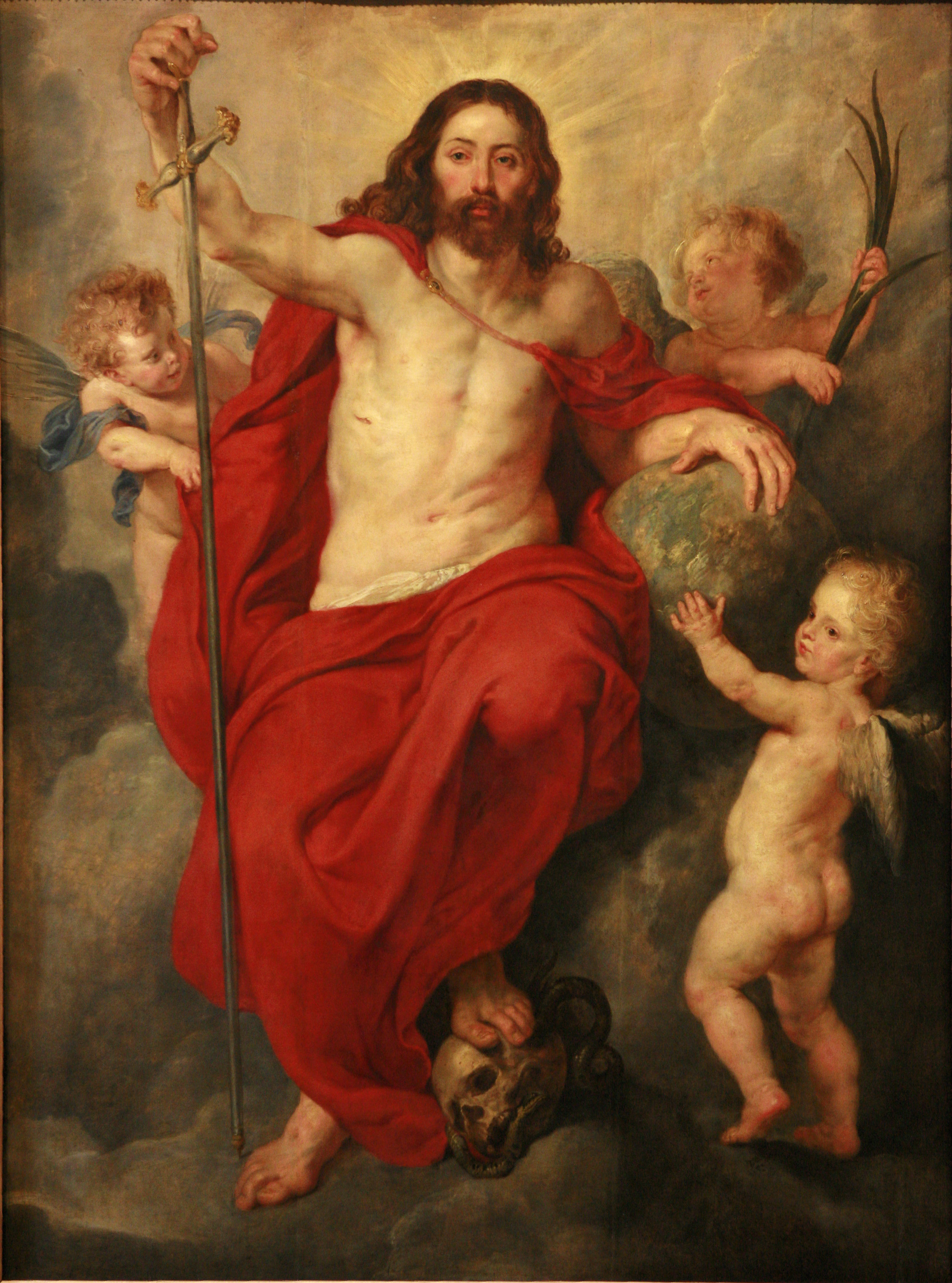
Christ Triumphant over Sin and Death, Musée des Beaux-Arts de Strasbourg

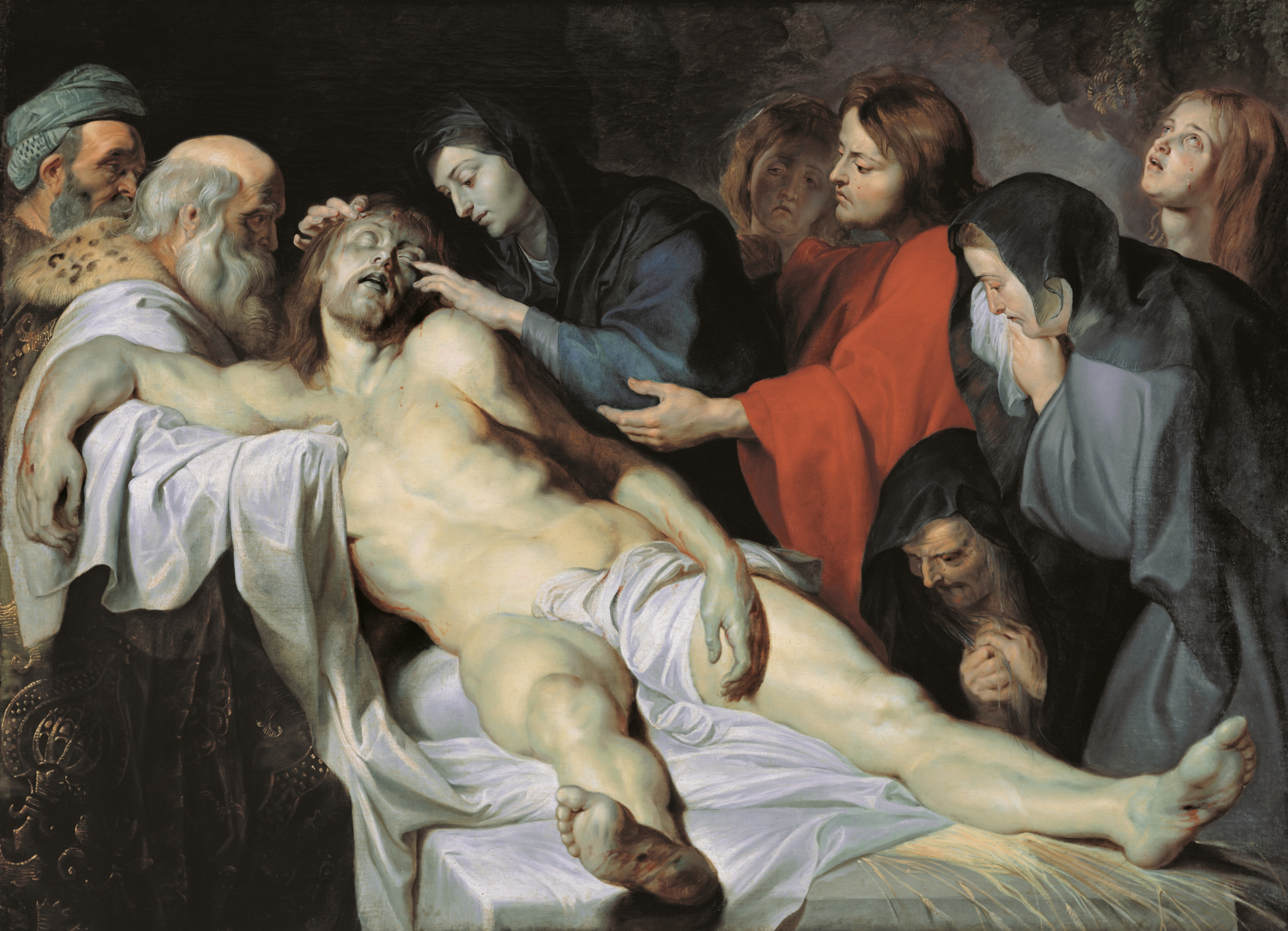
The Lamentation of Christ, c. 1612, Liechtenstein Museum
Drawings

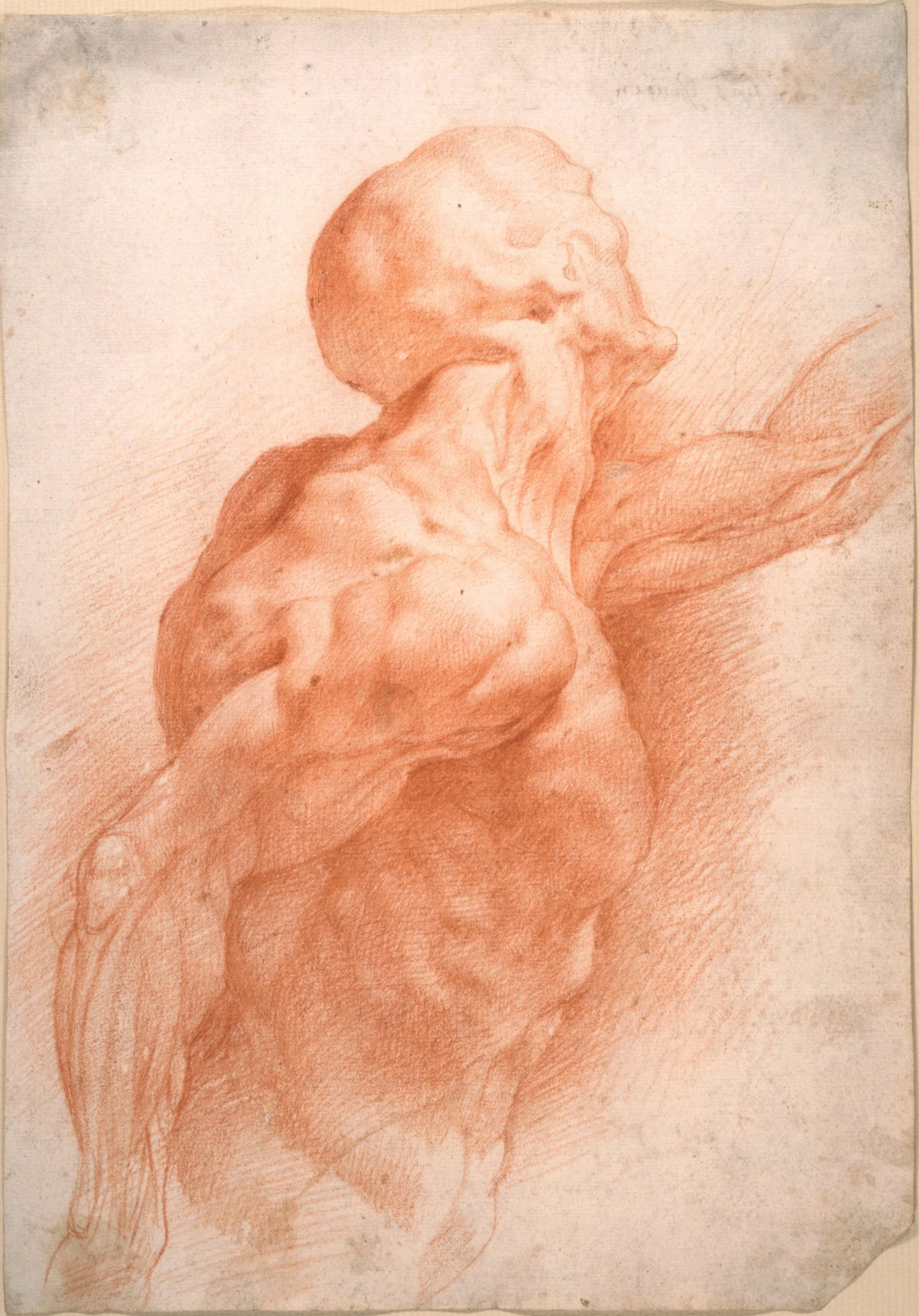
The Night, c, 1607, Jan Krugier Foundation

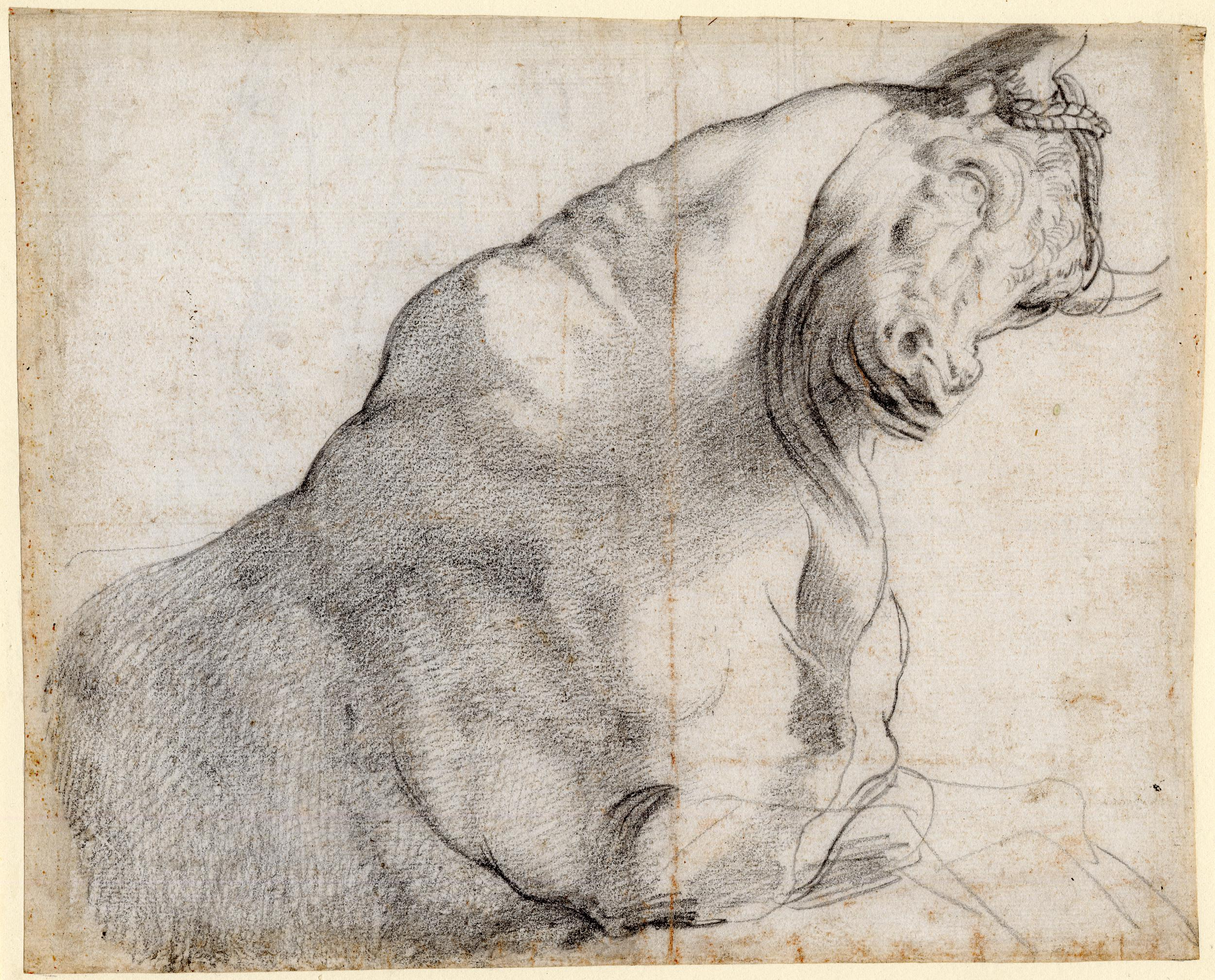
The Farnese bull, 1600–1608, British Museum

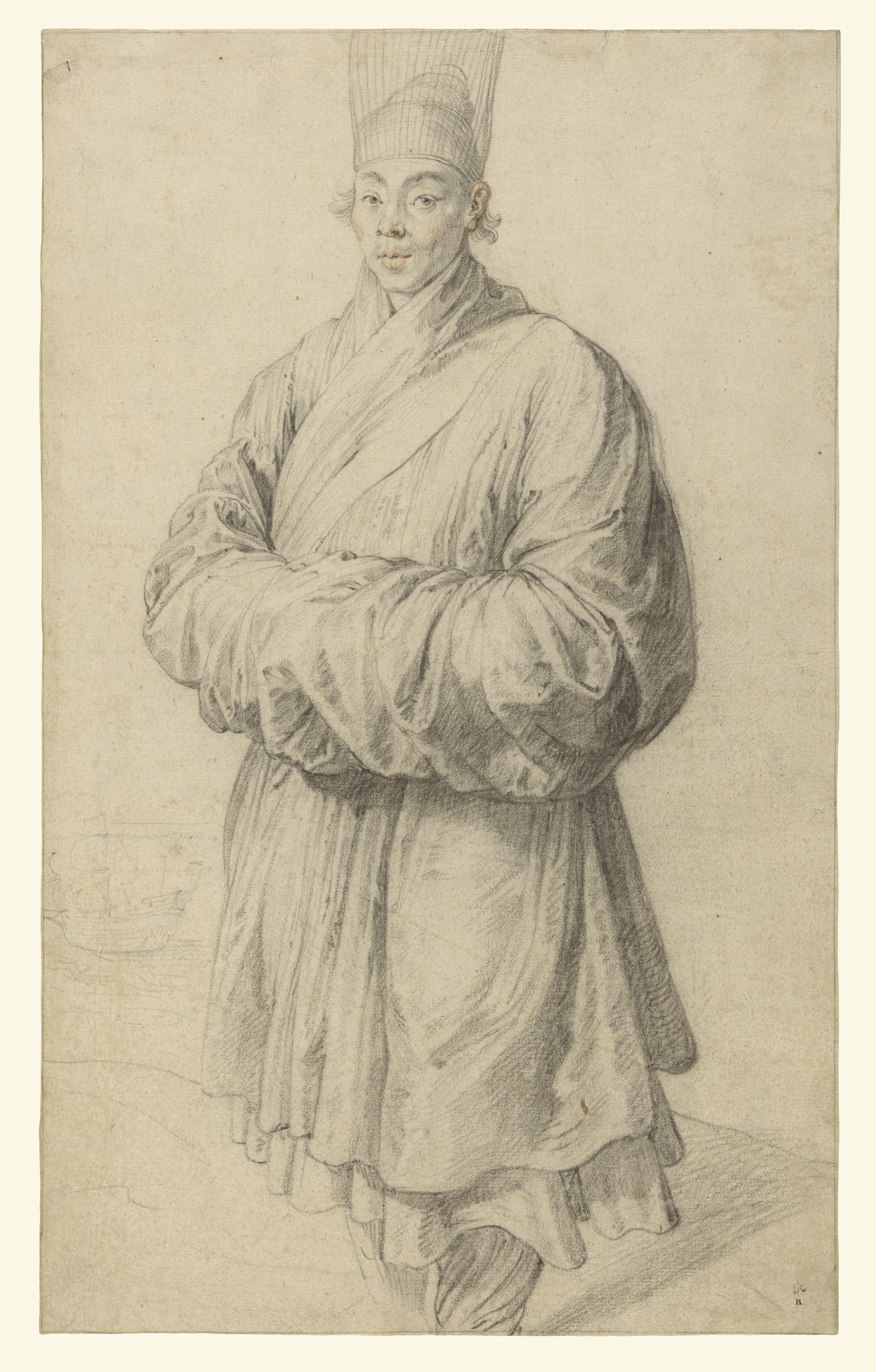
Man in Korean Costume, c. 1617, black chalk with touches of red chalk, J. Paul Getty Museum

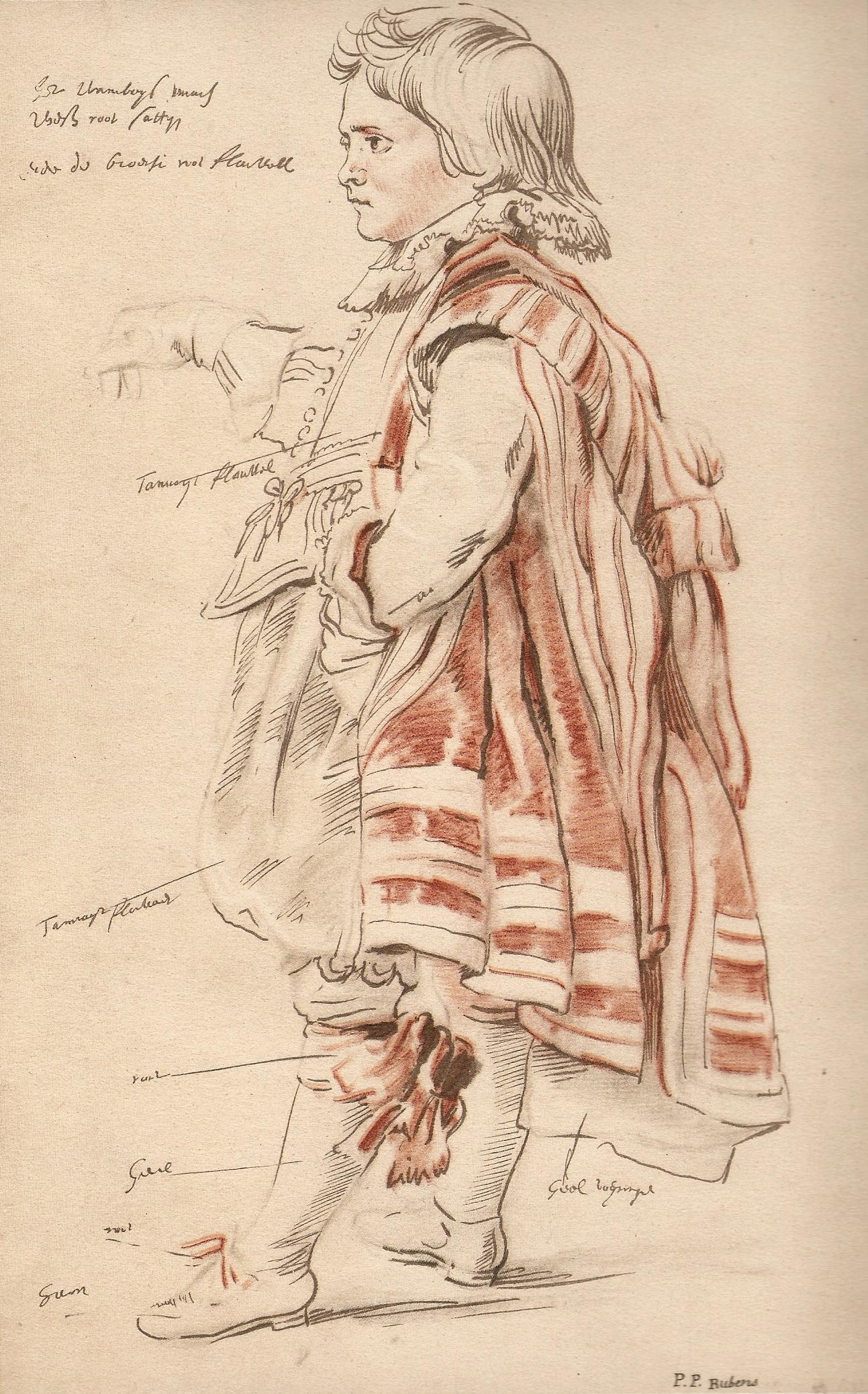
Robin, the Dwarf of the Earl of Arundel, 1620, pen and brown ink over red, black and white chalk, Nationalmuseum Stockholm

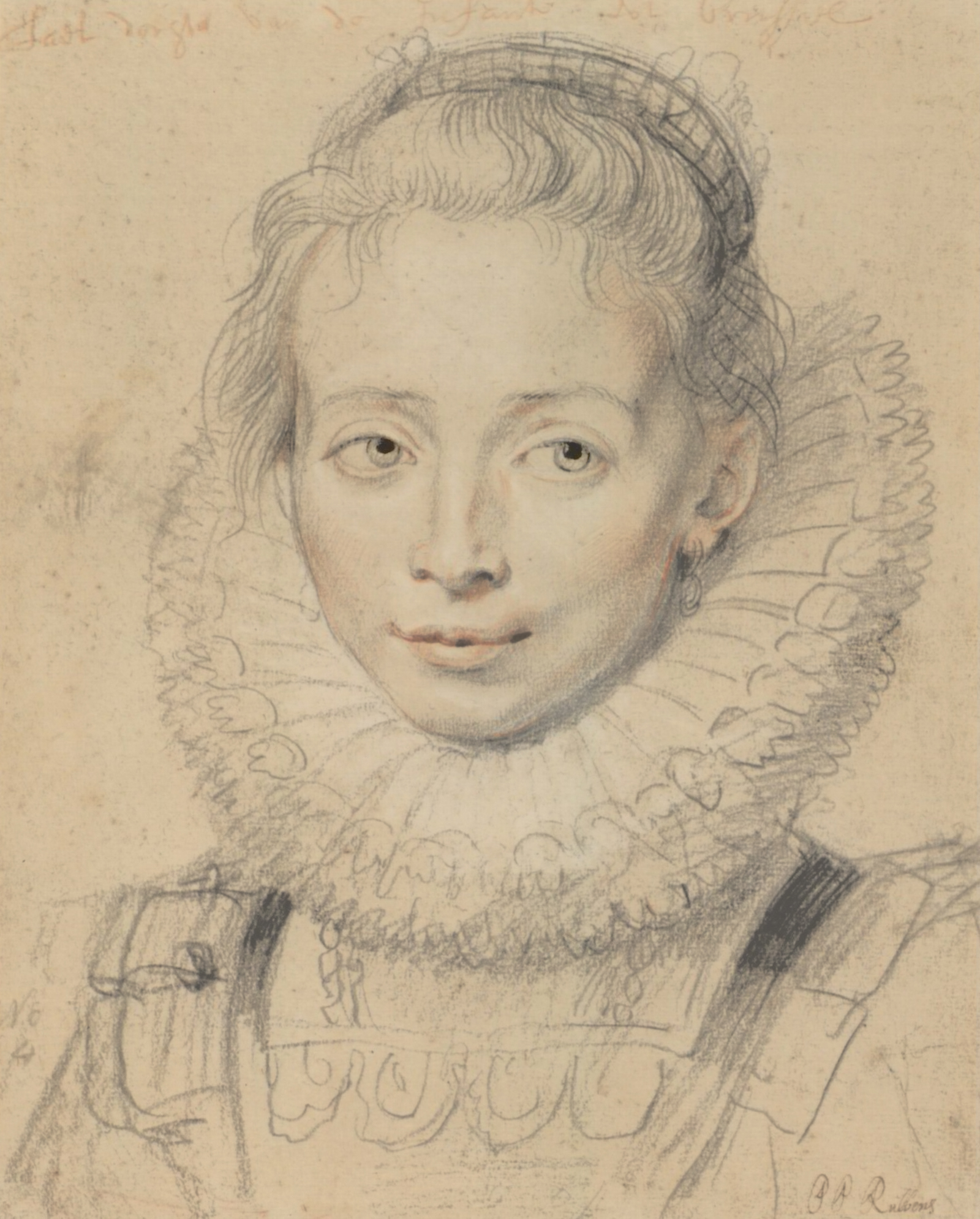
Possibly Rubens's daughter Clara Serena, c. 1623, Albertina

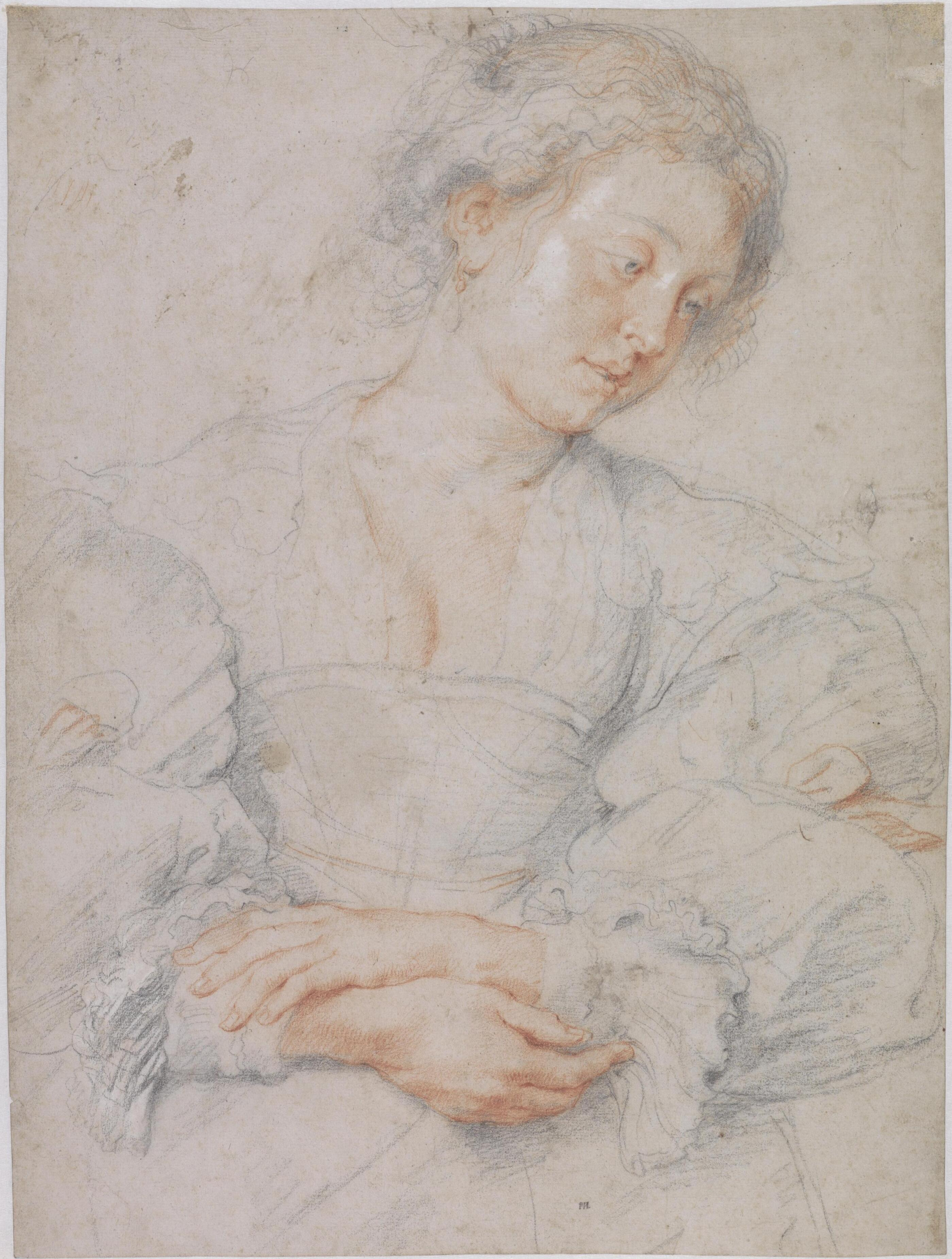
Young Woman with Folded Hands, c. 1629–30, red and black chalk, heightened with white, Museum Boijmans Van Beuningen

== Sources ==
- Auwers, Michael, Pieter Paul Rubens als diplomatiek debutant. Het verhaal van een ambitieus politiek agent in de vroege zeventiende eeuw, in: Tijdschrift voor Geschiedenis – 123e jaargang, nummer 1, p. 20–33 (in Dutch)
- Belkin, Kristin Lohse (1998). Rubens. Phaidon Press. ISBN 0-7148-3412-2.
- Belting, Hans (1994). Likeness and Presence: A History of the Image before the Era of Art. University of Chicago Press. ISBN 0-226-04215-4.
- Evers, Hans Gerhard: Peter Paul Rubens. F. Bruckmann, Munich 1942, 528 pages, 272 images, 4 colour plates (Flemish edition at De Sikkel, Antwerp 1946). (Information on the book and download link)
- Evers, Hans Gerhard: Rubens und sein Werk. Neue Forschungen. De Lage Landen, Brussels 1943. 383 pages and plates (information on the book and download link)
- Held, Julius S. (1975) "On the Date and Function of Some Allegorical Sketches by Rubens." In: Journal of the Warburg and Courtauld Institutes. Vol. 38: 218–233.
- Held, Julius S. (1983) "Thoughts on Rubens' Beginnings." In: Ringling Museum of Art Journal: 14–35. ISBN 0-916758-12-5.
- Hymans, Henri Simon; Konody, Paul George (1911). "Rubens, Peter Paul" . In Chisholm, Hugh (ed.). Encyclopædia Britannica. Vol. 23 (11th ed.). Cambridge University Press. p. 804.
- Jaffé, Michael (1977). Rubens and Italy. Cornell University Press. ISBN 0-8014-1064-9.
- Lamster, Mark. Master of Shadows: The Secret Diplomatic Career of the Painter Peter Paul Rubens, Random House Incorporated, 2010.
- Martin, John Rupert (1977). Baroque. HarperCollins. ISBN 0-06-430077-3.
- Mayor, A. Hyatt (1971). Prints and People. Metropolitan Museum of Art/Princeton. ISBN 0-691-00326-2.
- Pauw-De Veen, Lydia de. "Rubens and the graphic arts". In: Connoisseur CXCV/786 (Aug 1977): 243–251.
- Rooses, Max, Rubens, London, Druckworth & Co., 1904
