= Self-Portrait in a Circle of Friends from Mantua =

Painting by Peter Paul Rubens

Self-Portrait in a Circle of Friends in Mantua
- Self-Portrait in a Circle of Stoic Friends in Mantua
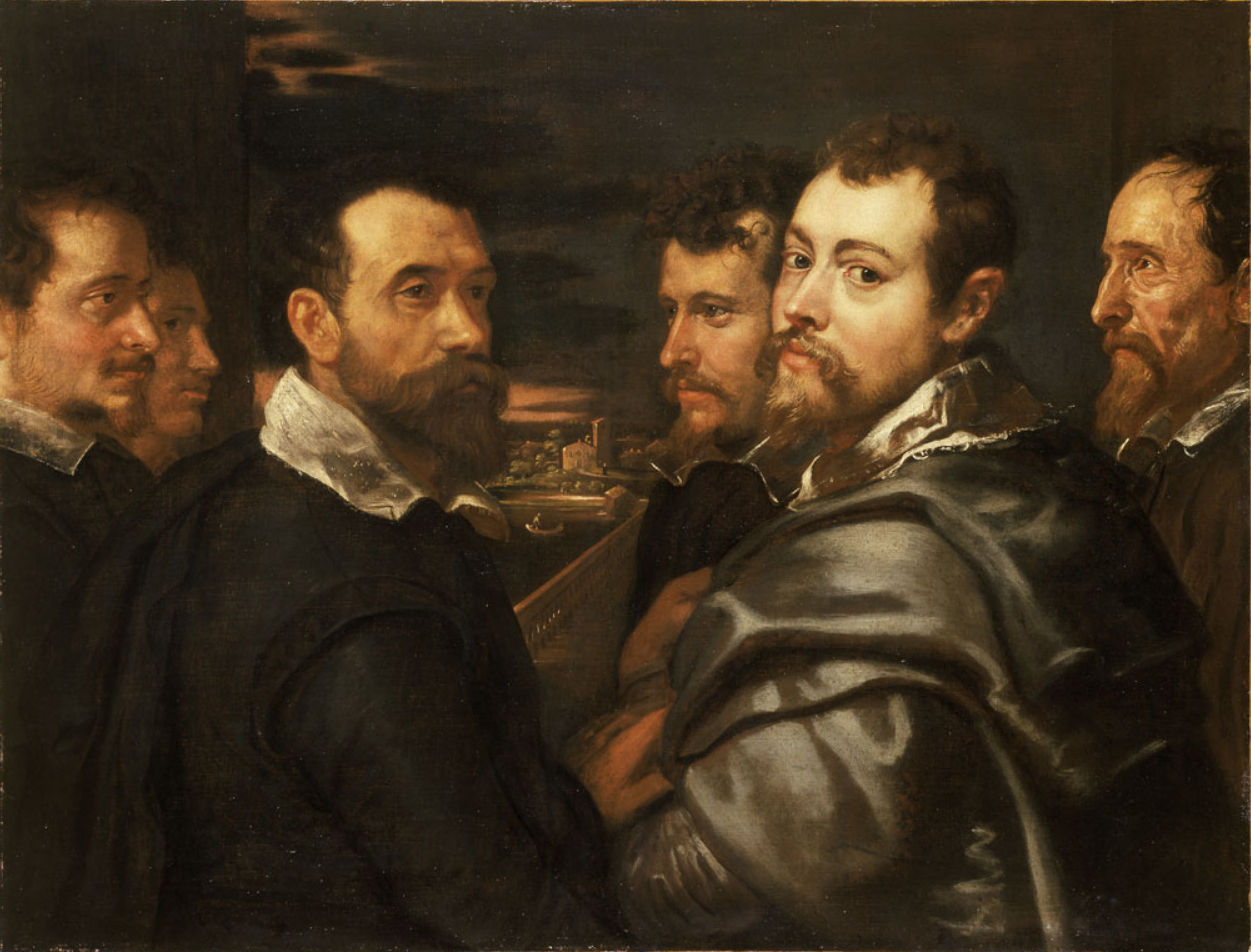
- Artist: Peter Paul Rubens
- Year: 1602–1606
- Medium: oil paint, canvas
- Dimensions: 77.5 cm (30.5 in) × 101 cm (40 in)
- Location: Wallraf–Richartz Museum, Wallraf–Richartz Museum, Munich Central Collecting Point, Führermuseum
- Accession: Dep. 0248, 3009

Self-portrait in a circle of friends in Mantua, also referred to as Self-Portrait in the Circle of Mantuan Friends or, for short, as Mantuan Friendship Picture is an oil painting on canvas by the Flemish artist Peter Paul Rubens, produced between 1602 and 1606 when the artist worked in Mantua as a court painter of the Gonzagas. It is in the collection of the Wallraf-Richartz Museum in Cologne. It is the oldest known self-portrait by Rubens. It falls in a particular genre of portraits which was popular in the 16th and 17th century, the so-called friendship portrait which depicts an informal gathering of friends or companions. It is more specifically a portrait of a circle of Stoic friends or companions.

== Description ==
The picture depicts six men at bust-length shown in profile or semi-profile in front of a marine landscape bathed in an unnatural light. A barque or gondola is visible on the lake.

== Setting ==
In the distance a small section of a marine landscape and a dramatically lit sky are visible. While following the rediscovery of the painting in the early 20th century, the painting was initially believed to be depicting a scene in Rome, a careful study of the landscape has shown that it is actually a view of Mantua. It represents the Ponte di San Giorgio (Saint George Bridge, destroyed), which divided the Lago Inferiore (Lower Lake) and the Lago di Mezzo (Middle Lake). The vantage point for seeing the bridge from the angle depicted in the painting must have been the Palazzo Ducale, and more precisely what is now the Appartamento della Mostra or Rustica. Rubens was at the time a court painter to the Gonzaga family in Mantua living in the Palazzo.

== Identification of the sitters ==
There is a scholarly consensus that the picture does not depict an actual meeting of the persons depicted in it. Rather it falls in a genre of form of portrait painting referred to as friendship portraits in which an artist depicts together portraits of friends or acquaintances who are connected through a common feature, such as for instance a friendship portrait of fellow artists.

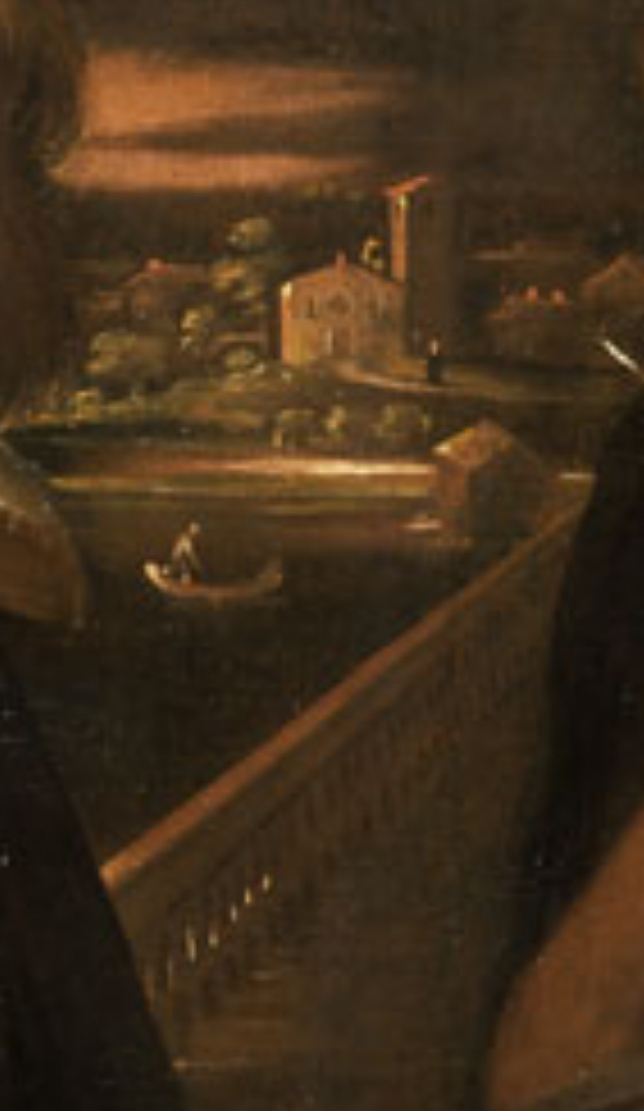
Self-Portrait in a Circle of Friends in Mantua (landscape detail)

Rubens placed himself on the centre right of the picture with his gaze turned directly towards the viewer. He is wearing a satin costume with a lace collar, more rich and elaborate than those of the other sitters. He is depicted somewhat closer and above the other sitters, in the so-called "Venetian pose", i.e. with his back half turned to the viewer and looking back over his shoulder. This has been interpreted as an expression of the artist's self-confidence.

Rubens is surrounded by bust portraits of five men shown in profile or semi-profile. There is no consensus on the identity of some of the sitters in the portrait. Immediately behind Rubens is the portrait of his older brother Philip who was a philologist, antiquarian, legal scholar and librarian. He had traveled to Italy in 1601 to further his studies and met up with his brother in Mantua in 1604. Philip had studied in his home country with the famous philosopher Justus Lipsius (18 October 1547 – 23 March 1606). Lipsius was feted throughout Europe for his Neostoic writings. In these he attempted to build a bridge between the Christian religion and the Antique philosophy of Stoicism. Other students of Lipsius in Flanders are also depicted in the composition: the young Guillaume (or Willem) Richardot on the far left with either Nicolaas Rockox or Juan Batiste Perez de Baron behind him. Lipsius himself is depicted almost like a portrait bust on the right-hand edge of the picture, as if he is overlooking the others as their mentor. The barque or gondola on the lake may be a reference to the Styx, the river of the Underworld in Greek mythology and its inclusion in the picture could mean that Lipsius was already dead at the time it was painted, although this is not certain.

The person immediately across from Rubens who has placed his hand on his arm was long thought to be his fellow Flemish painter Frans Pourbus the Younger. Pourbus was a portrait painter at the court at Mantua during the period that Rubens was also a court painter there. It is now believed that the person is not Pourbus but the famous scientist Galileo Galilei. Galilei likely visited Mantua during Rubens' residence. The pair are known to have established a life-long friendship. Recent X-ray radiography seems to support the identification with Galilei. It revealed under the left eye of the sitter a circular irregularity which seems to evoke the wart that is depicted at that same location in many other portraits of Galilei. It is possible that this wart has become less prominent due to later overpainting and varnishing of Rubens' canvas. The prominent presence of Galilei in this circle of Stoic friends has been explained by the fact that the Rubens brothers were of the view that Galilei relied on Stoic principles in some of his theories. Lipsius had been the founder of Stoic science with his 1605 edition of Seneca's Naturales quaestiones (Natural Questions), which influenced, amongst others, Kepler. Galileo can be regarded as a member of the group of Neo-Stoics in terms of his ideas and his interest in Seneca. Galilei's teachings on optics were also of great importance to Rubens, who himself authored a work on optics. The reddish luminous phenomenon in the left half of the landscape which mainly surrounds Galilei has been interpreted as the depiction of an aurora borealis, a yet poorly understood event at the time. Galileo's gesture of placing his hand on Rubens' arm has been interpreted in various ways from "consolatio" to a simple friendly touch.

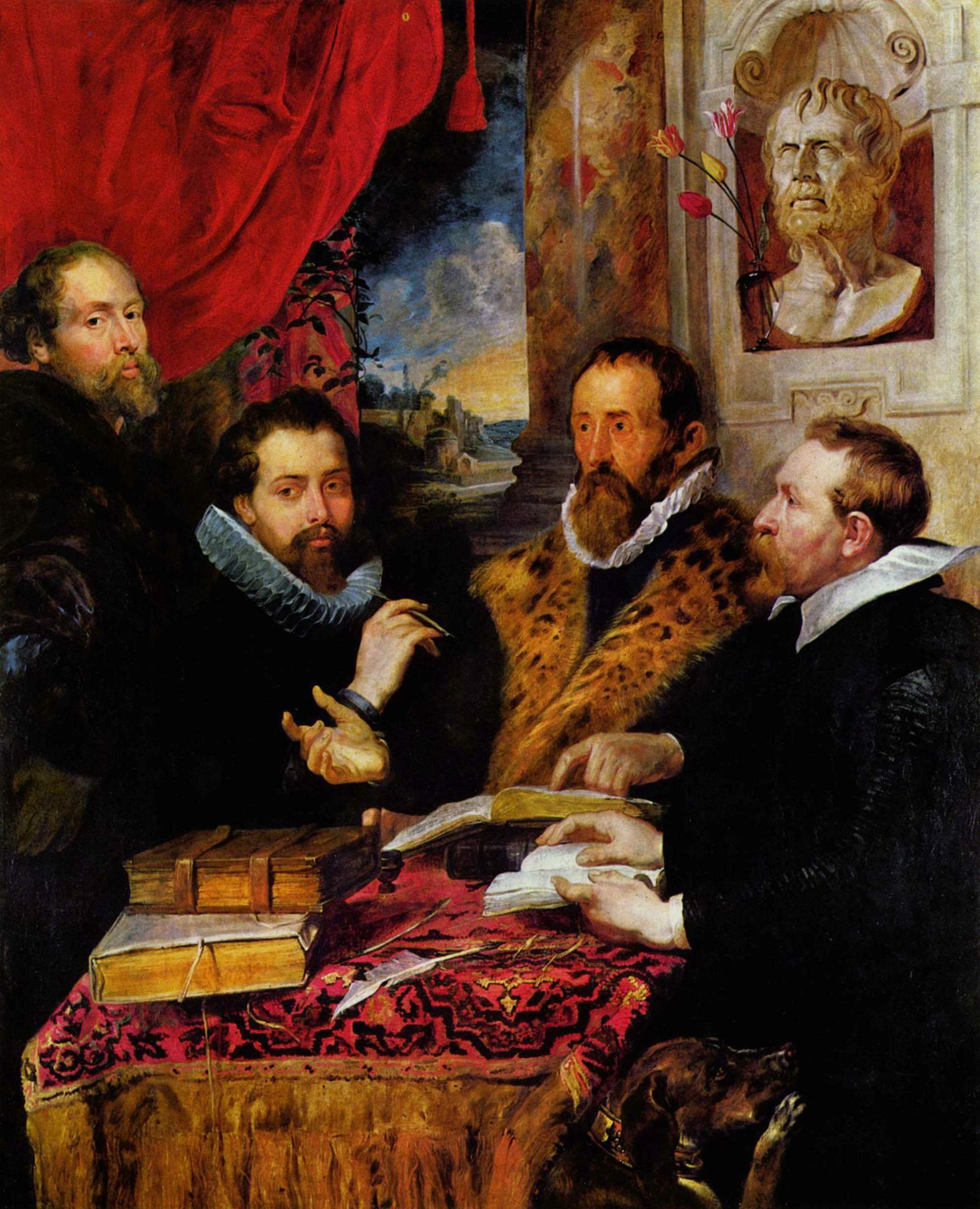
The Four Philosophers

As some art historians believed that the person depicted across Rubens was the Flemish portrait painter Frans Pourbus the younger, the painting was interpreted as being a friendship portrait of artists. It is now clear that the work does not depict a meeting of artist friends, but rather an imaginary gathering of Stoic friends and companions who were personally and intellectually important to Rubens during his years in Mantua. By creating a friendship portrait of this circle of close, learned friends, Rubens emphasized his social status and showed his desire to be regarded as an educated, learned painter, i.e. as a 'pictor doctus'. He clearly felt that his friendships with these humanist scholars 'ennobled' him on an intellectual level.

== Another Stoic friendship portrait by Rubens ==
In 1611–12 Rubens painted another, better known group portrait of four Neo-Stoic companions. Referred to traditionally as The Four Philosophers (Galleria Palatina of the Palazzo Pitti in Florence), it depicts Rubens, his brother Philip, Lipsius and Joannes Woverius. In a niche on the right-hand wall is a bust owned by Rubens which was at the time believed to be a portrait of Seneca, but has since been identified as a copy of an imaginary Hellenistic portrait of the Greek poet Hesiod.
