= Edward Ecclestone =

- Born: c.1647 Charnock Richard, Lancashire
- Died: 1675; Oldswinford, Worcestershire
- Resting place: St Mary’s Church, Oldswinford, Worcestershire
- Parent: William Ecclestone

Edward Ecclestone (c.1647–1675) was an English cleric, rector of St Mary's, Oldswinford in Worcestershire.

== Life ==
Edward Ecclestone was a son of William Ecclestone of Charnock Richard, Lancashire. He was educated at Lincoln College, Oxford, matriculating on 3 July 1663 at the age of 16. He was awarded his BA on 24 February 1666. He died and was buried at Oldswinford on 24 January 1675.

== Career ==
Ecclestone was the household chaplain to Thomas Foley, appointed on the recommendation of Richard Baxter. According to Nash (citing the Register of Bishop Walter Blandford), Foley presented Ecclestone as rector of Oldswinford on 17 May 1673. Ecclestone corresponded with Baxter about conforming, with the exchanges becoming acrimonious as Ecclestone decided to conform.

== Suggested authorship of Noah's Flood ==
Edward Ecclestone has been identified as the author of a verse version of Noah's Flood, a sequel to Dryden's The State of Innocence (1677). This work was first published in 1679 with subsequent versions in 1685 and 1690. Although it is possible Noah's Flood was the posthumous publication of Edward Ecclestone of Oldswinford, it is less likely that the subsequent versions could be attributed to his authorship. The title page describes the author as "Gent". A second Edward Eccleston(e) is listed as a graduate of Oxford and is described as the son of Thomas of Middlesex, "gent". (Note: A limited biography of the second Edward Ecclestone is given by Peter Holland.) (Edward Ecclestone of Oldswinford's father is described as "pleb".) There is no evidence to prefer the identification of Edward Ecclestone of Oldswinford as the author of Noah's Flood.

== See also ==
- Gerard Langbaine (1698). "Edward Eccleston". The Lives and Characters of the English Dramatick Poets: 53. Wikidata Q113375230.

Church of England titles
Preceded by Robert Pierson	Rector of St Mary's Oldswinford; 1673 –1675	Succeeded by Simon Ford
