= Euro gold and silver commemorative coins (Belgium) =

Gold and silver issues of the euro commemorative coins in Belgium

Kingdom of Belgium (in Dutch) Koninkrijk België (in French) Royaume de Belgique (in German) Königreich Belgien
- ISO 3166 code: BE

Euro gold and silver commemorative coins are special euro coins minted and issued by member states of the Eurozone, mainly in gold and silver, although other precious metals are also used in rare occasions. Belgium was one of the first twelve countries in the Eurozone that introduced the euro (€) on 1 January 2002. Since then, the Belgian Royal Mint have been minting both normal issues of Belgian euro coins, which are intended for circulation, and commemorative euro coins in gold and silver.

These special coins are only legal tender in Belgium, unlike the normal issues of the Belgian euro coins, which are legal tender in every country of the Eurozone. This means that the commemorative coins made of gold and silver cannot be used as money in other countries. Furthermore, as their bullion value generally vastly exceeds their face value, these coins are not intended to be used as means of payment at all—although it remains possible. For this reason, they are usually named Collectors' coins.

The coins usually commemorate the anniversaries of historical events or draw attention to current events of special importance. Belgium mints five of these coins on average per year, in both gold and silver, with face value ranging from 10 to 100 euros. All the coins were designed by Luc Luycx.

== Summary ==
As of 3 July 2008, 27 variations of Belgian commemorative coins have been minted: two in 2002, two in 2003, four in 2004, four in 2005, six in 2006, six in 2007, seven in 2008 and two in 2009 so far. These special high-value commemorative coins are not to be confused with €2 commemorative coins, which are coins designated for circulation and do have legal tender status in all countries of the Eurozone.

The following table shows the number of coins minted per year. In the first section, the coins are grouped by the metal used, while in the second section they are grouped by their face value. Data from years 2020 to 2024 were sourced from Belgian Federal Public Service.

Year	Issues	By metal			By face value						
Year	Issues	gold	silver	Others	€100	€50	€25	€20	€12.5	€10	€5
2002	2	1	1	–	1	–	–	–	–	1	–
2003	2	1	1	–	1	–	–	–	–	1	–
2004	4	2	2	–	1	1	–	–	–	2	–
2005	4	1	3	–	1	–	–	1	–	2	–
2006	5	3	2	–	1	1	–	–	1	3	–
2007	6	3	3	–	1	1	–	1	1	2	–
2008	7	4	3	–	1	1	1	–	1	2	1
2009	6	3	3	–	1	1	–	1	1	2	–
2010	7	3	4	–	1	1	–	1	1	2	1
2011	7	4	3	–	1	2	–	-	1	2	1
2012	5	3	2	–	1	1	–	1	1	2	0
2013	7	3	4	–	1	1	–	1	1	2	1
2014	7	3	4	–	1	1	–	1	1	2	1
2015	9	5	4	–	1	1	1	–	2	2	2
2016	9	4	5	–	1	1	1	1	1	2	2
2017	9	3	6	–	1	-	1	2	1	2	2
2018	8	4	4	–	1	1	1	1	1	2	1
2019	6	3	3	–	-	1	1	–	1	2	1
2020	7	2	3	2	–	1	–	1	1	1	3
2021	9	3	3	3	–	1	1	1	1	1	4
2022	4	1	2	1	–	–	–	1	1	1	1
2023	4	1	2	1	–	–	–	1	1	1	1
2024	3	1	2	1	–	–	–	1	1	1	1
Total	137	61	69	7	17	17	7	15	20	39	22
Coins were minted No coins were minted Scheduled to be minted

== 2002 coinage ==
50th Anniversary of the Brussels North–South connection			
Designer: Luc Luycx		Mint: Royal Belgian Mint	
Value: €10	Alloy: Ag 925 (silver)	Quantity: 50,008	Quality: Proof
Issued: 16 October 2002	Diameter: 33 mm (1.30 in)	Weight: 18.75 g (0.66 oz; 0.60 ozt)	
The euro was introduced in the Eurozone on 1 January 2002. As a result, Belgium started to mint collectors' coins in late 2002. This coin was their first euro commemorative coin released. The obverse (front side) shows a train coming out of one of the tunnels in the North–South connection in Brussels. On the coin is written the words Noord-Zuidverbinding Jonction Nord-Midi ("North–South connection" in Dutch and French, respectively) and the years 1952 (representing the opening of the connection) and 2002. The reverse (back side) shows the effigy of King Albert II, facing to the left surrounded by stars representing the European Union. "Belgium" in the three official languages is displayed as well as the nominal value of 10 euro.
50 Years of the European Coal and Steel			
Designer: Luc Luycx		Mint: Royal Belgian Mint	
Value: €100	Alloy: Au 999 (gold)	Quantity: 5,013	Quality: Proof
Issued: 16 December 2002	Diameter: 29 mm (1.14 in)	Weight: 15.55 g (0.55 oz; 0.50 ozt)	
After the introduction of the euro in 2002, this was the first commemorative euro coin released in gold. The obverse shows a portrait with the names of three pioneers of European unification: Robert Schuman, Paul-Henri Spaak and Konrad Adenauer. The reverse shows a map of the European Union as of 2002. "Belgium" in the three official languages is displayed as well as the nominal value of 100 euro.

== 2003 coinage ==
100th Birthday of Georges Simenon			
Designer: Luc Luycx		Mint: Royal Belgian Mint	
Value: €10	Alloy: Ag 925 (silver)	Quantity: 45,086	Quality: Proof
Issued: 20 February 2003	Diameter: 33 mm (1.30 in)	Weight: 18.75 g (0.66 oz; 0.60 ozt)	
Although his well-known protagonist, Detective Inspector Maigret, was Parisian, Georges Simenon was one of the most famous Belgian writers of the 20th century. With more than 200 novels, most of them translated into several dozen languages and more than fifty adapted for television and the large screen, he has left a large collection of masterpieces behind. Two of them, My Friend Maigret (1949) and Maigret in Court (1960) were named in 1987 as two of the hundred best crime novels. For his work particularly on police novels, Belgium has chosen to honor the centennial of his birth (13 February 1903) with a 10-euro sterling silver commemorative coin. The obverse front side shows his portrait. The reverse shows a map of the European Union as of 2003. "Belgium" in the three official languages is displayed as well as the nominal value of 10 euro, surrounded by the 12 stars of the union.
200th Anniversary of the French Monetary Reform			
Designer: Luc Luycx		Mint: Royal Belgian Mint	
Value: €100	Alloy: Au 999 (gold)	Quantity: 4,503	Quality: Proof
Issued: 15 November 2003	Diameter: 29 mm (1.14 in)	Weight: 15.55 g (0.55 oz; 0.50 ozt)	
The obverse of the coin shows the two faces of the "Germinal Franc", a currency established in 1803. Some historians consider that, since it references to both gold and silver, this currency indicates the creation of the bi-metallic system. The reverse shows the effigy of King Albert II. To the left of the coin, the royal mint mark is depicted. "Belgium" in the three official languages is displayed in the middle as well as the nominal value of 100 euro.

== 2004 coinage ==
75 Years of The Adventures of Tintin			
Designer: Luc Luycx		Mint: Royal Belgian Mint	
Value: €10	Alloy: Ag 925 (silver)	Quantity: 50,006	Quality: Proof
Issued: 4 January 2004	Diameter: 33 mm (1.30 in)	Weight: 18.75 g (0.66 oz; 0.60 ozt)	
The coin celebrates the 75th anniversary of the famous Belgian cartoon The Adventures of Tintin, also known as Kuifje. The minting of this coin received a lot of attention worldwide; even the Belgian Finance Minister Didier Reynders attended the minting ceremony. "It is important to celebrate Tintin and Hergé not only in Belgium, but all over the world", he said. A portrait of Tintin and his dog Snowy can be seen on the obverse of the coin. The reverse show a map of the European Union as of 2004. "Belgium" in the three official languages is displayed as well as the nominal value of 10 euro, surrounded by the 12 stars of the union.
Expansion of the European Union			
Designer: Luc Luycx		Mint: Royal Belgian Mint	
Value: €10	Alloy: Ag 925 (silver)	Quantity: 40,626	Quality: Proof
Issued: 30 July 2004	Diameter: 33 mm (1.30 in)	Weight: 18.75 g (0.66 oz; 0.60 ozt)	
The female character Europa, abducted by Zeus, watching the continent from the skies, is shown on the obverse of the coin. The continent Europe has ultimately been named after this female character. In the eighth century, ecclesiastical uses of Europa for the imperium of Charlemagne provide the source for the modern geographical term. The name of Europe as a geographical term came in use by Ancient Greek geographers such as Strabo. It is derived from the Greek word Europa (Ευρώπη) in almost all European languages. Europa has been used frequently as a symbol of Europe; statues of her and the bull, are placed outside several European Union institutions. On the reverse of the coin, "Belgium" in the three official languages is displayed as well as the nominal value of 10 euro, surrounded by the 12 stars of the union.
70th Birthday of King Albert II			
Designer: Luc Luycx		Mint: Royal Belgian Mint	
Value: €50	Alloy: Au 999 (gold)	Quantity: 3,671	Quality: Proof
Issued: 30 July 2004	Diameter: 21 mm (0.83 in)	Weight: 6.22 g (0.22 oz; 0.20 ozt)	
The obverse shows the effigy of King Albert II. To the left of the coin, the royal mint mark is depicted with the number 70, representing his 70th birthday. The reverse shows, for the first time, the map of the whole of Europe as a representation of the European Union Expansion that took place in 2004. "Belgium" in the three official languages is displayed as well as the nominal value of 50 euro, surrounded by the 12 stars of the union.
Expansion of the European Union			
Designer: Luc Luycx		Mint: Royal Belgian Mint	
Value: €100	Alloy: Au 999 (gold)	Quantity: 5,000	Quality: Proof
Issued: 2004	Diameter: 29 mm (1.14 in)	Weight: 15.55 g (0.55 oz; 0.50 ozt)	
On 1 May 2004, eight of the old Socialist states (Czech Republic, Estonia, Hungary, Latvia, Lithuania, Poland, Slovakia, and Slovenia), plus the Mediterranean islands of Malta and Cyprus, joined the union. This was the largest single enlargement in terms of people and landmass, although the smallest in terms of GDP. To commemorate this remarkable event, the Belgian mint minted this gold commemorative coin. The obverse shows ten famous landmarks, each of them located in one of the ten new members of the European Union, surrounding the euro symbol with the 12 stars of the union. The reverse shows the new map of the union, with the new members added. The names of these new members are also shown to the right of the map.

== 2005 coinage ==
Belgium-Luxembourg Economic Union			
Designer: Luc Luycx; Jan Alfons Keusterman		Mint: Brussels	
Value: €2	Alloy: CuZn25Ni5+Ni (brass); CuNi25 (copper-nickel)	Quantity: 5,997,000	Quality: Regular
Issued: 1 March 2005	Diameter: 2,527 mm (99.49 in)	Weight: 8.50 g (0.30 oz; 0.27 ozt)	
100th Anniversary of Derby of the Low Countries. 75th Anniversary of Heizel Stadium.			
Designer: Luc Luycx		Mint: Royal Belgian Mint	
Value: €10	Alloy: Ag 925 (silver) & Cu 75 (copper)	Quantity: 50,000	Quality: Proof
Issued: 2005	Diameter: 33 mm (1.30 in)	Weight: 18.75 g (0.66 oz; 0.60 ozt)	
The obverse depicts an image of a footballer with the Heysel/Heizel Stadium in the background. The flags of Belgium and the Netherlands can be seen on top of the stadium. The stadium, also known as King Baudouin Stadium (French: Stade Roi Baudouin, Dutch: Koning Boudewijnstadion), is a sports ground in north-west Brussels. It was inaugurated on 23 August 1930 (days after Belgium's 100th anniversary) as the Jubilee Stadium (French: Stade du Centenaire, Dutch: Jubelstadion) in the presence of Prince Leopold III. It was built to embellish the Heysel/Heizel Plateau in view of the 1935 World's Fair. The stadium hosted 70,000 people at the time. This coin was minted to celebrate the 75th anniversary of this event. The reverse of the coin shows a map of the European Union as of 2005, including the recently joined ten new members. "Belgium" in the three official languages is displayed as well as the nominal value of 10 euro, surrounded by the 12 stars of the union.
60 Years of Peace and Freedom in Europe			
Designer: Luc Luycx		Mint: Royal Belgian Mint	
Value: €10	Alloy: Ag 925 (silver)	Quantity: 26,095	Quality: Proof
Issued: May 2005	Diameter: 33 mm (1.30 in)	Weight: 18.75 g (0.66 oz; 0.60 ozt)	
The obverse features a stylised version of the Phoenix rising from the ashes, as a representation of a new Europe post 1945, celebrating 60 years of peace and freedom in the continent. The reverse shows a map of Europe. "Belgium" in the three official languages is displayed as well as the nominal value of 10 euro, surrounded by the 12 stars of the European Union.
FIFA Football World Cup Germany 2006			
Designer: Luc Luycx		Mint: Royal Belgian Mint	
Value: €20	Alloy: Ag 999 (silver)	Quantity: 9,211	Quality: Proof
Issued: 8 December 2005	Diameter: 37 mm (1.46 in)	Weight: 22.85 g (0.81 oz; 0.73 ozt)	
In the obverse, an effigy of a soccer player commemorating the games is depicted. The reverse shows the effigy of King Albert II, facing to the left surrounded by the 12 stars of the union. "Belgium" in the three official languages is displayed as well as the nominal value of 20 euro.
175th Anniversary of Belgium Independence			
Designer: Luc Luycx		Mint: Royal Belgian Mint	
Value: €100	Alloy: Au 999 (gold)	Quantity: 5,000	Quality: Proof
Issued: 2005	Diameter: 29 mm (1.14 in)	Weight: 15.55 g (0.55 oz; 0.50 ozt)	
The Belgian Revolution was a conflict in the United Kingdom of the Netherlands that began with a riot in Brussels in August 1830 and eventually led to the establishment of an independent, Roman Catholic and neutral Belgium (William I, king of the Netherlands, would refuse to recognize a Belgian state until 1839, when he had to yield under pressure by the Treaty of London). This coin commemorates the 175th anniversary of this event. The obverse depicts the famous painting "Scene of the September days in 1830", a representation of the Belgian Revolution. On the reverse there is an effigy of King Albert II, facing to the left surrounded by the 12 stars of the European Union. "Belgium" in the three official languages is displayed as well as the nominal value of 100 euro.

== 2006 coinage ==
Justus Lipsius			
Designer: Luc Luycx		Mint: Royal Belgian Mint	
Value: €10	Alloy: Ag 925 (silver) & Cu 75 (copper)	Quantity: 50,000	Quality: Proof
Issued: 2006	Diameter: 33 mm (1.30 in)	Weight: 18.75 g (0.66 oz; 0.60 ozt)	
Justus Lipsius			
Designer: Luc Luycx		Mint: Royal Belgian Mint	
Value: €50	Alloy: Au 999 (gold)	Quantity: 2,500	Quality: Proof
Issued: 2006	Diameter: 21 mm (0.83 in)	Weight: 6.22 g (0.22 oz; 0.20 ozt)	
The 400th anniversary of the death of Belgian philosopher Justus Lipsius is the theme of Belgium's contribution to the 2006 Europa coin program of famous European personalities. Born in 1547, Lipsius came to be known for his writings on stoicism. The most famous of these was entitled De Constantia ("On Constancy"), and in it he spoke of the merits of a Stoic-inspired ideal of constancy whenever people were faced with unpleasant events or circumstances. His teachings led to a philosophical movement known today as "Neostoicism". Lipsius died in 1606. The obverse of the coin features an image of Lipsius, surrounded by the inscription of his name and the dates 1547–1606. The reverse shows a map of Europe as one continent. "Belgium" in the three official languages is displayed as well as the nominal value of 10 euro, surrounded by the 12 stars of the European Union. The same coin was also minted in pure gold, with a face value of 50 euros.
50th anniversary of the catastrophe Bois du Cazier at Marcinelle			
Designer: Luc Luycx		Mint: Royal Belgian Mint	
Value: €10	Alloy: Ag 925 (silver)	Quantity: 50,000	Quality: Proof
Issued: 2006	Diameter: 33 mm (1.30 in)	Weight: 18.75 g (0.66 oz; 0.60 ozt)	
50th anniversary of the catastrophe Bois du Cazier at Marcinelle			
Designer: Luc Luycx		Mint: Royal Belgian Mint	
Value: €10	Alloy: Ag 925 (silver) & Cu 75 (copper)	Quantity: 2,000	Quality: Proof
Issued: 2006	Diameter: 33 mm (1.30 in)	Weight: 18.75 g (0.66 oz; 0.60 ozt)	
This coin was minted as a tribute to an accident that occurred in the mines of Bois du Cazier at Marcinelle. On the morning of 8 August 1956, a fire in the mines of Marcinelle caused 262 victims. At the time of the incident, 274 people were working in the colliery Bois du Cazier, also known as Puits Saint-Charles. A wrongly placed mining wagon on the elevator cage hit an oil pipe and indirectly the electricity lines when the elevator started moving. This caused a fire, which trapped the miners working in the galleries. Only 12 people survived. The obverse shows a portrait of a miner, with the mine Bois du Cazier in the background. In one version of the coin, the portrait of the miner is minted in copper, which gives a unique character to this coin.
175 years of Belgian Dynasty			
Designer: Luc Luycx		Mint: Royal Belgian Mint	
Value: €100	Alloy: Au 999 (gold)	Quantity: 5,000	Quality: Proof
Issued: 2006	Diameter: 29 mm (1.14 in)	Weight: 15.55 g (0.55 oz; 0.50 ozt)	
The obverse shows the monument dedicated to Leopold I. Built in 1881, it celebrated the 50th anniversary of the Belgian Dynasty. Six royal monograms can be seen around the monument. The reverse shows the map of the European Union, including the new members that joined in 2004.
175 years of Belgian Dynasty			
Designer: Luc Luycx		Mint: Royal Belgian Mint	
Value: €12.50	Alloy: Au 999 (gold)	Quantity: 15,000	Quality: Proof
Issued: 2006	Diameter: 14 mm (0.55 in)	Weight: 1.25 g (0.04 oz; 0.04 ozt)	
This was the first 12.50-euro coin ever minted by Belgium. The obverse of the coin shows a portrait of Leopold I, the father of the Belgian dynasty. On the reverse, a seated lion can be observed. The design of this lion is an original resemblance of a very old coin: the 2 centimes made of copper, minted from 1835 to 1865, one of the first coins minted by the Belgian dynasty. Under the lion, the words "Belgium" in the three official languages and the face value of 12.50 euro can be seen.

== 2007 coinage ==
Treaty of Rome			
Designer: Luc Luycx		Mint: Royal Belgian Mint	
Value: €10	Alloy: Ag 925 (silver) & Cu 75 (copper)	Quantity: 40,000	Quality: Proof
Issued: 2007	Diameter: 33 mm (1.30 in)	Weight: 18.75 g (0.66 oz; 0.60 ozt)	
The obverse shows a goose feather on top of a document, symbolizing the signature of the Treaty of Rome in 1957, the first step of the union. Six lines can be seen coming out of the pen, each of them representing one of the original members. The reverse shows a map of the countries of the European Union. For the first time, it includes the countries of the new members Bulgaria and Romania.
International Polar Foundation			
Designer: Luc Luycx		Mint: Royal Belgian Mint	
Value: €10	Alloy: Ag 925 (silver) & Cu 75 (copper)	Quantity: 50,000	Quality: Proof
Issued: 2007	Diameter: 33 mm (1.30 in)	Weight: 18.75 g (0.66 oz; 0.60 ozt)	
This coin was issued to commemorate the 4th International Polar Year and the establishment of a new Belgian scientific base on Antarctica. On the obverse, a view of the polar station with its three wind turbines can be seen, as well as some of the polar ice mountains in the background. The reverse shows the map of the European Union as of 2007. The word "Belgium" is written in the three official languages, with the face value of 10 euro. In the bottom of the coin, the name of the foundation "Princess Elizabeth Antarctica" is written.
100th Anniversary of Hergé's birth			
Designer: Luc Luycx		Mint: Royal Belgian Mint	
Value: €20	Alloy: Ag 925 (silver) & Cu 75 (copper)	Quantity: 50,000	Quality: Proof
Issued: 2007	Diameter: 37 mm (1.46 in)	Weight: 22.85 g (0.81 oz; 0.73 ozt)	
In the obverse, a self-portrait of Hergé can be seen to the left. Hergé was one of the most famous Belgian comics writer and artist. To the right of the portrait, there is a portrait of his masterpiece Kuifje (Tintin). In the bottom of the coin, Hergé's signature is depicted. The reverse shows the map of the European Union as of 2007. The word "Belgium" is written in the three official languages, with the face value of 20 euro.
Leopold II			
Designer: Luc Luycx		Mint: Royal Belgian Mint	
Value: €12.50	Alloy: Au 999 (gold)	Quantity: 15,000	Quality: Proof
Issued: 2007	Diameter: 14 mm (0.55 in)	Weight: 1.25 g (0.04 oz; 0.04 ozt)	
This coin was also issued commemorating the 175th anniversary of the Belgian royal dynasty. On the obverse is the effigy of King Leopold II, the second King of the Belgians, and the inscription LEOPOLDVS II and the date 2007. On the reverse, a seated lion can be observed under the words "Belgium" in the three official languages, on top of the face value of 12.50 euro.
Treaty of Rome			
Designer: Luc Luycx		Mint: Royal Belgian Mint	
Value: €50	Alloy: Au 999 (gold)	Quantity: 2,500	Quality: Proof
Issued: 2007	Diameter: 21 mm (0.83 in)	Weight: 6.22 g (0.22 oz; 0.20 ozt)	
Similarly to the 10-euro "Treaty of Rome" coin, the obverse shows a goose feather on top of a document, symbolizing the signature of the Treaty of Rome in 1957, the very first step of the union. Six lines can be seen coming out of the pen, each of them representing one of the original members. The reverse shows the map of the European Union as of 2007. The word "Belgium" is written in the three official languages, with the face value of 50 euro.
175th Anniversary of Belgian coins			
Designer: Luc Luycx		Mint: Royal Belgian Mint	
Value: €100	Alloy: Au 999 (gold)	Quantity: 5,000	Quality: Proof
Issued: 2007	Diameter: 29 mm (1.14 in)	Weight: 15.55 g (0.55 oz; 0.50 ozt)	
The obverse shows a very old coin die, used to mint the first Belgian coins. Around it there are six representations of the most common pre-euro Belgian coins. The reverse shows the map of the European Union as of 2007. The word "Belgium" is written in the three official languages, with the face value of 100 euro.

== 2008 coinage ==
Maurice Maeterlinck			
Designer: Luc Luycx		Mint: Royal Belgian Mint	
Value: €10	Alloy: Ag 925 (silver)	Quantity: 20,000	Quality: Proof
Issued: 2008	Diameter: 33 mm (1.30 in)	Weight: 18.75 g (0.66 oz; 0.60 ozt)	
Maurice Maeterlinck			
Designer: Luc Luycx		Mint: Royal Belgian Mint	
Value: €50	Alloy: Au 999 (gold)	Quantity: 2,500	Quality: Proof
Issued: 2008	Diameter: 21 mm (0.83 in)	Weight: 6.22 g (0.22 oz; 0.20 ozt)	
This coin was issued to commemorate the 100th anniversary of Maurice Maeterlinck's greatest contemporary success: L'Oiseau Bleu, written in 1908. Maurice was a Belgian poet, playwright, and essayist writing in French. He was awarded the Nobel Prize in Literature in 1911. The play premiered on 30 September 1908 at Constantin Stanislavski's Moscow Art Theatre and has been turned into several films and a TV series. The story is about a girl called Mytyl and her brother Tyltyl seeking happiness, represented by The Blue Bird of Happiness, aided by the good fairy Berylune. This coin features on its obverse the image of the blue bird spreading its wings and leaving the confines of its cage for freedom. The unusual aspect of this coin is that the bird itself is actually colored in blue (as in the name of the play). Above the bird are the years signifying the 100th anniversary of the Blue Bird play, 1908–2008, and above that is the emblem for the Europa series. In a semicircle around the top rim of the coin is the name of Maurice Maeterlinck, while around the bottom are the words, in French and Dutch respectively, for The Blue Bird. The reverse shows a clear view of all the countries of the Eurozone, surrounded by the word "Belgium" in the three official languages and the face value of 10 euro.
2008 Olympic Games			
Designer: Luc Luycx		Mint: Royal Belgian Mint	
Value: €10	Alloy: Ag 925 (silver)	Quantity: 20,000	Quality: Proof
Issued: 2008	Diameter: 33 mm (1.30 in)	Weight: 18.75 g (0.66 oz; 0.60 ozt)	
2008 Olympic Games			
Designer: Luc Luycx		Mint: Royal Belgian Mint	
Value: €25	Alloy: Au 999 (gold)	Quantity: 5,000	Quality: Proof
Issued: 2008	Diameter: 18 mm (0.71 in)	Weight: 3.11 g (0.11 oz; 0.10 ozt)	
On the occasion of the 2008 Summer Olympics in Beijing, China, the Royal Mint of Belgium have issued a commemorative coin in silver. The reverse shows on the right side a nominal value of 10 euro and the year of issue (2008), and in the center a map of Europe with all 27 member states of the EU. The obverse carries on the right side a symbol of the Belgian Olympic Committee, in the center an analog of the Olympic flambeau, which will constantly burn during the Olympic Games, and on the left side symbols of four Olympic disciplines: cycling, hockey, athletics and tennis. The same coin was also minted in pure gold, with a face value of 25 euros. A particularity of this gold coin is that for the first time since the introduction of the euro in coins in 2002, the Belgian Mint is minting a coin with a face value of 25 euro.
The Smurfs – 50th Anniversary			
Designer: Luc Luycx		Mint: Royal Belgian Mint	
Value: €5	Alloy: Ag 925 (silver)	Quantity: 18,000	Quality: Proof
Issued: 2008	Diameter: 30 mm (1.18 in)	Weight: 15 g (0.53 oz; 0.48 ozt)	
The Smurfs – 50th Anniversary			
Designer: Luc Luycx		Mint: Royal Belgian Mint	
Value: €5	Alloy: Ag 925 (silver)	Quantity: 7,000	Quality: Proof
Issued: 2008	Diameter: 30 mm (1.18 in)	Weight: 15 g (0.53 oz; 0.48 ozt)	
Fifty years after their first appearance in a Comics book, the Smurfs are still to be reckoned among the most popular comics figures in the world. This issue celebrates the 50th anniversary of the Smurfs, and the 80th birthday of its inventor, Peyo. The figure of a smurf can be seen in the obverse of the coin (plain silver in one issue, colored in the other).
Albert I			
Designer: Luc Luycx		Mint: Royal Belgian Mint	
Value: €12.50	Alloy: Au 999 (gold)	Quantity: 10,000	Quality: Proof
Issued: 2008	Diameter: 14 mm (0.55 in)	Weight: 1.25 g (0.04 oz; 0.04 ozt)	
On the obverse is the effigy of Albert I, and the inscription ALBERTVS I with the date 2008. On the reverse, a seated lion can be observed under the words "Belgium" in the three official languages, on top of the face value of 12.50 euro.
50th Anniversary of the International Expo in Belgium			
Designer: Luc Luycx		Mint: Royal Belgian Mint	
Value: €100	Alloy: Au 999 (gold)	Quantity: 3,000	Quality: Proof
Issued: 2008	Diameter: 29 mm (1.14 in)	Weight: 15.5 g (0.55 oz; 0.50 ozt)	
The International Expo in Belgium, also known as Expo 58 or Brussels World's Fair, was held from 17 April to 19 October 1958. It was the first major World's Fair after World War II. The site is best known for a giant model of a unit cell of an iron crystal (each sphere representing an atom), called the Atomium, which decades later remains one of the best known landmarks of Brussels. More than 42 million visitors visited the site, which was opened with a call for world peace and social and economic progress, issued by King Baudouin I. This coin was issued to celebrate the 50th anniversary of this event; on the obverse of the coin the logo of the exposition is depicted.

== 2009 coinage ==
10 Years of the European Economic Union			
Designer: Luc Luycx; Georges Stamatopoulos		Mint: Wien	
Value: €2	Alloy: CuZn25Ni5+Ni (brass); CuNi25 (copper-nickel)	Quantity: 4,988,000	Quality: Regular
Issued: 2009	Diameter: 25.27 mm (0.99 in)	Weight: 8.50 g (0.30 oz; 0.27 ozt)	
200th Anniversary of the Birth of Louis Braille (1809–1852)			
Designer: Luc Luycx		Mint: Brussels	
Value: €2	Alloy: CuZn25Ni5+Ni (brass); CuNi25 (copper-nickel)	Quantity: 4,987,500	Quality: Regular
Issued: 2009	Diameter: 25.27 mm (0.99 in)	Weight: 8.50 g (0.30 oz; 0.27 ozt)	
75th Birthday of King Albert II			
Designer: Luc Luycx		Mint: Mennica Belgijska	
Value: €10	Alloy: Ag 925 (silver)	Quantity: 5,871	Quality: Proof
Issued: 2009	Diameter: 33 mm (1.30 in)	Weight: 18.75 g (0.66 oz; 0.60 ozt)	
500th Anniversary of "The Praise of Folly" by Erasmus			
Designer: Luc Luycx		Mint: Mennica Belgijska	
Value: €10	Alloy: Ag 925 (silver)	Quantity: 12,756	Quality: Proof
Issued: 2009	Diameter: 33 mm (1.30 in)	Weight: 18.75 g (0.66 oz; 0.60 ozt)	
King Leopold III			
Designer: Luc Luycx		Mint: Mennica Belgijska	
Value: €12.50	Alloy: Au 999 (gold)	Quantity: 5,000	Quality: Proof
Issued: 2009	Diameter: 14 mm (0.55 in)	Weight: 1.25 g (0.04 oz; 0.04 ozt)	
King Leopold III			
Designer: Luc Luycx		Mint: Mennica Belgijska	
Value: €20	Alloy: Ag 925 (silver)	Quantity: 6,500	Quality: Proof
Issued: 2009	Diameter: 37 mm (1.46 in)	Weight: 22.85 g (0.81 oz; 0.73 ozt)	
500th Anniversary of "The Praise of Folly" by Erasmus			
Designer: Luc Luycx		Mint: Mennica Belgijska	
Value: €50	Alloy: Au 999 (gold)	Quantity: 3,000	Quality: Proof
Issued: 2009	Diameter: 21 mm (0.83 in)	Weight: 6.22 g (0.22 oz; 0.20 ozt)	
Desiderius Erasmus Roterodamus (sometimes known as Desiderius Erasmus of Rotterdam) was a Dutch Renaissance humanist and Catholic Christian theologian. Erasmus was a classical scholar who wrote in a "pure" Latin style and enjoyed the sobriquet "Prince of the Humanists." One of his masterpieces is the essay The Praise of Folly (Greek title: Morias Enkomion (Μωρίας Εγκώμιον), Latin: Stultitiae Laus, sometimes translated as "In Praise of Folly", Dutch title: Lof der Zotheid); written in 1509. Erasmus revised and extended the work while sojourning with Sir Thomas More. In Praise of Folly is considered one of the most influential works of literature in Western civilization and one of the catalysts of the Protestant Reformation. The 500th Anniversary of this essay is the main motif for the firsts two commemorative coins in 2009. On the obverse of the coin, is an effigy of Erasmus. To his left are two samples of the most famous pen and ink illustrations from the 1515 edition. In the center of the coin, the years MDIX (1509 in Roman numerals) and 2009 are clearly shown. The reverse shows a view of all the countries of the Eurozone, surrounded by the word "Belgium" in its three official languages and the face value of 10 euro.
50th Wedding Anniversary of King Albert II and Queen Paola			
Designer: Luc Luycx		Mint: Mennica Belgijska	
Value: €100	Alloy: Au 999 (gold)	Quantity: 1,485	Quality: Proof
Issued: 2009	Diameter: 29 mm (1.14 in)	Weight: 15.55 g (0.55 oz; 0.50 ozt)	

== 2010 coinage ==
Belgian Presidency of the Council of the European Union			
Designer: Luc Luycx		Mint:Brussels	
Value: €2	Alloy: CuZn25Ni5+Ni (brass); CuNi25 (copper-nickel)	Quantity: 5 million	Quality: Regular
Issued: 2010	Diameter: 25.27 mm (0.99 in)	Weight: 8.50 g (0.30 oz; 0.27 ozt)	
The inner part of the coin shows the stylised letters EU and trio.be. Above the letters is the inscription BELGIAN PRESIDENCY OF THE COUNCIL OF THE EU 2010 and below it the trilingual inscription BELGIE BELGIQUE BELGIEN. Underneath the logo, the mint mark is displayed to the left of the year mark, and the nint master's mark to the right. The twelve stars of the European Union surround the design on the outer ring of the coin.
100th Birthday of Django Reinhardt			
Designer: Luc Luycx		Mint: Mennica Belgijska	
Value: €5	Alloy: Ag 925 (silver)	Quantity: 7,800	Quality: Proof
Issued: 2010	Diameter: 30 mm (1.18 in)	Weight: 14.60 g (0.51 oz; 0.47 ozt)	
100th Birthday of Django Reinhardt			
Designer: Luc Luycx		Mint: Mennica Belgijska	
Value: €10	Alloy: Ag 925 (silver)	Quantity: 3,842	Quality: Proof
Issued: 2010	Diameter: 33 mm (1.30 in)	Weight: 18.75 g (0.66 oz; 0.60 ozt)	
100 Years of the Royal Museum for Central Africa			
Designer: Luc Luycx		Mint: Mennica Belgijska	
Value: €20	Alloy: Ag 925 (silver)	Quantity: 12,529	Quality: Proof
Issued: 2010	Diameter: 33 mm (1.30 in)	Weight: 18.75 g (0.66 oz; 0.60 ozt)	
A Dog of Flanders			
Designer: Luc Luycx		Mint: Mennica Belgijska	
Value: €20	Alloy: Ag 925 (silver)	Quantity: 2,475	Quality: Proof
Issued: 2010	Diameter: 37 mm (1.46 in)	Weight: 22.85 g (0.81 oz; 0.73 ozt)	
King Baldwin I			
Designer: Luc Luycx		Mint: Mennica Belgijska	
Value: €20	Alloy: Au 999 (gold)	Quantity: 5,000	Quality: Proof
Issued: 2010	Diameter: 14 mm (0.55 in)	Weight: 1.25 g (0.04 oz; 0.04 ozt)	
100 Years of the Royal Museum for Central Africa			
Designer: Luc Luycx		Mint: Mennica Belgijska	
Value: €50	Alloy: Au 999 (gold)	Quantity: 2,475	Quality: Proof
Issued: 2010	Diameter: 21 mm (0.83 in)	Weight: 6.22 g (0.22 oz; 0.20 ozt)	
50th Birthday of Philipp of Belgium			
Designer: Luc Luycx		Mint: Mennica Belgijska	
Value: €100	Alloy: Au 999 (gold)	Quantity: 1,814	Quality: Proof
Issued: 2010	Diameter: 29 mm (1.14 in)	Weight: 15.55 g (0.55 oz; 0.50 ozt)	

== 2011 coinage ==
100 Years International Women's Day			
Designer: Luc Luycx		Mint:Brussels	
Value: €2	Alloy: CuZn25Ni5+Ni (brass); CuNi25 (copper-nickel)	Quantity: 5 million	Quality: Regular
Issued: 2011	Diameter: 25.27 mm (0.99 in)	Weight: 8.50 g (0.30 oz; 0.27 ozt)	
50th Death Anniversary of Hélène Dutrieu			
Designer: Luc Luycx		Mint: Mennica Belgijska	
Value: €5	Alloy: Ag 925 (silver)	Quantity: 10,000	Quality: Proof
Issued: 2011	Diameter: 30 mm (1.18 in)	Weight: 14.60 g (0.51 oz; 0.47 ozt)	
Belgian Deep Sea Exploration			
Designer: Luc Luycx		Mint: Mennica Belgijska	
Value: €10	Alloy: Ag 925 (silver)	Quantity: 15,000	Quality: Proof
Issued: 2011	Diameter: 33 mm (1.30 in)	Weight: 18.75 g (0.66 oz; 0.60 ozt)	
100 Years South Pole Expedition			
Designer: Luc Luycx		Mint: Mennica Belgijska	
Value: €10	Alloy: Ag 925 (silver)	Quantity: 15,000	Quality: Proof
Issued: 2011	Diameter: 33 mm (1.30 in)	Weight: 18.75 g (0.66 oz; 0.60 ozt)	
King Albert II			
Designer: Luc Luycx		Mint: Mennica Belgijska	
Value: €12.50	Alloy: Au 999 (gold)	Quantity: 6,000	Quality: Proof
Issued: 2011	Diameter: 14 mm (0.55 in)	Weight: 1.25 g (0.04 oz; 0.04 ozt)	
100 Years South Pole Expedition			
Designer: Luc Luycx		Mint: Mennica Belgijska	
Value: €50	Alloy: Au 999 (gold)	Quantity: 2,500	Quality: Proof
Issued: 2011	Diameter: 21 mm (0.83 in)	Weight: 6.22 g (0.22 oz; 0.20 ozt)	
Belgian Deep Sea Exploration			
Designer: Luc Luycx		Mint: Mennica Belgijska	
Value: €50	Alloy: Au 999 (gold)	Quantity: 2,500	Quality: Proof
Issued: 2011	Diameter: 21 mm (0.83 in)	Weight: 6.22 g (0.22 oz; 0.20 ozt)	
150th Birthday of Victor Horta			
Designer: Luc Luycx		Mint: Mennica Belgijska	
Value: €100	Alloy: Au 999 (gold)	Quantity: 2,000	Quality: Proof
Issued: 2011	Diameter: 29 mm (1.14 in)	Weight: 15.55 g (0.55 oz; 0.50 ozt)	

== 2012 coinage ==
75 Years of Queen Elisabeth Competition			
Designer: Luc Luycx		Mint:Brussels	
Value: €2	Alloy: CuZn25Ni5+Ni (brass); CuNi25 (copper-nickel)	Quantity: 5 million	Quality: Regular
Issued: 2012	Diameter: 25.27 mm (0.99 in)	Weight: 8.50 g (0.30 oz; 0.27 ozt)	
10th Anniversary of Introduction of Euro Coins and Banknotes			
Designer: Helmut Andexlinger; Luc Luycx		Mint:Brussels	
Value: €2	Alloy: CuZn25Ni5+Ni (brass); CuNi25 (copper-nickel)	Quantity: 5 million	Quality: Regular
Issued: 2012	Diameter: 25.27 mm (0.99 in)	Weight: 8.50 g (0.30 oz; 0.27 ozt)	
75th Anniversary of the Death of Baron Pierre de Coubertin			
Designer: Luc Luycx		Mint: Brussels	
Value: €10	Alloy: Ag 925 (silver)	Quantity: 10,000	Quality: Proof
Issued: 2012	Diameter: 33 mm (1.30 in)	Weight: 18.75 g (0.66 oz; 0.60 ozt)	
In celebration of the 2012 Summer Olympics in London, England. Pierre de Coubertin was the 2nd President of the International Olympic Committee who helped to revive the Olympic Games. The reverse depicts him with a burning Olympic torch, surrounded by his name and pictograms. The obverse shows the word "Belgium" in three different languages, as well as the face value of 10 euro.
Paul Delvaux			
Designer: Luc Luycx		Mint: Brussels	
Value: €10	Alloy: Ag 925 (silver)	Quantity: 15,000	Quality: Proof
Issued: 2012	Diameter: 33 mm (1.30 in)	Weight: 18.75 g (0.66 oz; 0.60 ozt)	
Paul Delvaux			
Designer: Luc Luycx		Mint: Brussels	
Value: €50	Alloy: Au 999 (gold)	Quantity: 1,500	Quality: Proof
Issued: 2012	Diameter: 21 mm (0.83 in)	Weight: 6.22 g (0.22 oz; 0.20 ozt)	
500th Anniversary of the Birth of Gerardus Mercator			
Designer: Luc Luycx		Mint: Brussels	
Value: €100	Alloy: Au 999 (gold)	Quantity: 2,000	Quality: Proof
Issued: 2012	Diameter: 29 mm (1.14 in)	Weight: 15.55 g (0.55 oz; 0.50 ozt)	
