= Robert Pierson =

Robert Pierson may refer to:

- Robert H. Pierson (1911–1989), leading figure in the Seventh Day Adventists
- Robert Laughlin Pierson (1926–1997), Episcopal clergyman and Freedom Rider
- Robert Scott Pierson, Canadian shipping magnate
  - MV Robert S. Pierson, a lake freighter built in 1973
- Robert Pierson (minister) (died 1673), clergyman
- Robert Pierson (undercover officer), testified at the Chicago 7 trial, see Chicago 10
- Robert Pierson (voice actor), see Iczer Girl Iczelion
