= Henry Sampson (physician) =

English physician

Henry Sampson (1629?–1700) was an English nonconformist minister and physician.

== Life ==
The eldest son of William Sampson, he was born at South Leverton, Nottinghamshire, about 1629. His mother, Helen, daughter of Gregory Vicars and sister of John Viccars, married, in 1637, as her second husband, Obadiah Grew.

Sampson was educated at Atherstone grammar school, under his stepfather, and at King Henry VIII School, Coventry, under Phinehas White. In 1646 he entered Pembroke Hall, Cambridge, his tutor being William Moses. He graduated B.A. in 1650, was elected Fellow in the same year, and proceeded M.A. in 1653.

Sampson paid special attention to the study of Hebrew and New Testament Greek, and collected a library of critical editions of the scriptures. In 1650 he was presented by his college to the rectory of Framlingham, Suffolk, vacated by the sequestration of Richard Goultie for refusing the engagement. He was never ordained, but acquired a reputation as a preacher, both at Framlingham and Coventry. At Framlingham, where he had no literary neighbours, he added antiquarian to his theological interests.

At the Restoration Goultie was replaced in the rectory, but Sampson continued for some time to preach privately at Framlingham, and founded an independent congregation, later Unitarian. Turning to medicine, he studied at University of Padua and at the University of Leyden, where he graduated M.D. on 12 July 1668. He practised in London, and was admitted an honorary fellow of the Royal College of Physicians on 30 September 1680.

Sampson retained his nonconformity, attending the ministry of Lazarus Seaman, and later of John Howe. He died on 23 July 1700, and was buried in August at Clayworth, Nottinghamshire, where his brother, William Sampson, was rector.

== Works ==
He published Disputatio … de celebri indicationum fundamento, Contraria contrariis curari, &c., Leyden, 1668, and contributed papers on morbid anatomy to the Philosophical Transactions, 1674, 1678, 1681, 1695. His account (1663) of Framlingham Castle is printed in Thomas Hearne's editions of John Leland's Collectanea. He edited Methodus Divinæ Gratiæ (1657) by Thomas Parker.

Sampson's papers, including lists of the ejected ministers by county, were used by Edmund Calamy in the preparation of his Account (1713) of the silenced ministers of 1662. None of his manuscripts are now known to exist, but the British Museum acquired a volume (BL Addit. MS. 4460) of Ralph Thoresby's transcripts from Sampson's Day-books.

== Family ==
Sampson was twice married, but had no issue. His first wife, Elinor, died on 24 November 1689. His second wife, Anna, survived him.

== Notes ==
Attribution

This article incorporates text from a publication now in the public domain: "Sampson, Henry (1629?-1700)". Dictionary of National Biography. London: Smith, Elder & Co. 1885–1900.
