= Nathaniel Wanley =

English clergyman (1634–1680)

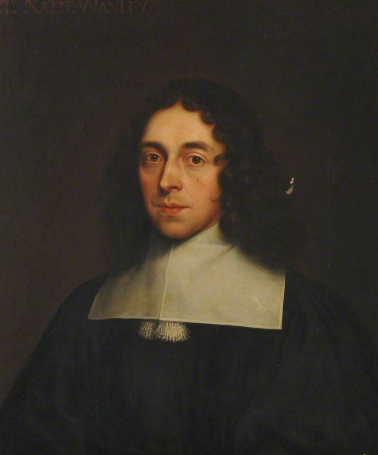
Wansley

Nathaniel Wanley (1634 – 1680) was an English clergyman and writer, known for The Wonders of the Little World.

== Life ==
He was born at Leicester in 1634, and baptised on 27 March. His father was a mercer. He was educated at Trinity College, Cambridge, and graduated B.A. in 1653, M.A. in 1657. His first preferment was as rector of Beeby, Leicestershire. On the resignation of John Bryan, the nonconformist vicar of Trinity Church, Coventry, Wanley was instituted his successor on 28 October 1662.

Wanley kept in touch with the prevailing Puritanism of Coventry. With Bryan, who attended his services though ministering also to a nonconformist congregation, he was intimate, and on Bryan's death in 1676 he preached his funeral sermon of warm appreciation. It was published posthumously, with the title Peace and Rest for the Upright, 1681.

Wanley died in 1680; he was succeeded by Samuel Barton on 22 December. Wanley gave or bequeathed to the grammar school library at Coventry a copy of the Imitatio Christi, described as ‘Ecclesiastical Music, written on Parchment, about the time of King Edward IV.’

== Works ==
His first publication, ‘Vox Dei, or the Great Duty of Self-reflection upon a Man's own Wayes,’ 1658, was dedicated to Dorothy Spencer, Countess of Sunderland. He also translated Justus Lipsius’s philosophical work De Constantia.

Wanley's major work is ‘The Wonders of the Little World; or a General History of Man. In Six Books,’ 1678. It was dedicated (17 June 1677) to Sir Harbottle Grimston, 2nd Baronet. The work, which is meant to illustrate anecdotically the prodigies of human nature, shows wide reading but is credulous; authorities are fully given and referenced. Later editions include that of 1774, with revision, and index; and 1806–7, 2 vols., with additions by William Johnston who worked with John Aikin on the General Biography.

Wanley compiled a history of the Fielding family, which is printed in John Nichols's Leicestershire.

He also wrote several poems dedicated to Robert Wild.

== Family ==
He was married on 24 July 1655; by his wife Ellen (b. 30 April 1633, d. 28 June 1719), daughter of Humphrey Burton, coroner and town clerk of Coventry, he had five children, among them Humfrey Wanley.
