= Nehemiah Grew =

English plant anatomist and physiologist (1641–1712)

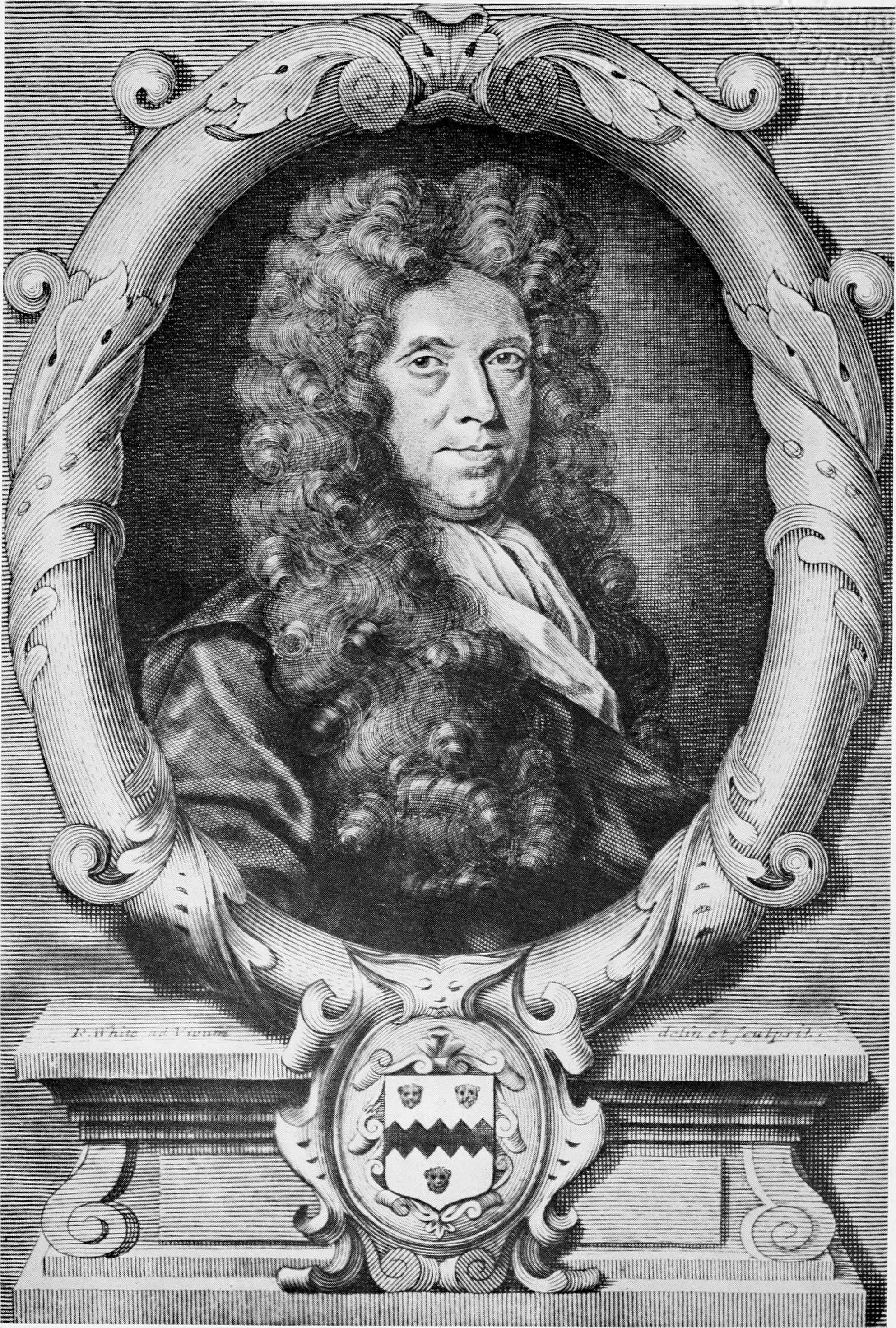
- Nehemiah Grew
- Born: 26 September 1641; Mancetter Parish, Warwickshire, England
- Died: 25 March 1712 (aged 70); London, England
- Education: Leiden University
- Scientific career
- Fields: Physiology

Nehemiah Grew (26 September 1641 – 25 March 1712) was an English plant anatomist and physiologist, known as the "Father of Plant Anatomy".

== Biography ==
Grew was the only son of Obadiah Grew (1607–1688), Nonconformist divine and vicar of St Michaels, Coventry, and was born in Warwickshire. He graduated at Pembroke College, Cambridge in 1661, and ten years later took the degree of MD at Leiden University, his thesis being Disputatio medico-physica de liquore nervoso. He began observations on the anatomy of plants in 1664, and in 1670 his essay, The Anatomy of Vegetables begun, was communicated to the Royal Society by Bishop Wilkins, on whose recommendation he was in the following year elected a fellow. In 1672, when the essay was published, he settled in London, and soon acquired an extensive practice as a physician. In 1673 he published his Idea of a Phytological History, which consisted of papers he had communicated to the Royal Society in the preceding year, and in 1677 he succeeded Henry Oldenburg as secretary of the society. He edited the Philosophical Transactions in 1678–1679, and in 1681 he published by request a descriptive catalogue of the rarities preserved at Gresham College, with which were printed some papers he had read to the Royal Society on the Comparative Anatomy of Stomachs and Guts.

In 1682 appeared his great work on the Anatomy of Plants, which also was largely a collection of previous publications. It was divided into four books, Anatomy of Vegetables begun, Anatomy of Roots, Anatomy of Trunks and Anatomy of Leaves, Flowers, Fruits and Seeds, and was illustrated with eighty-two plates, while appended to it were seven papers mostly of a chemical character. The Anatomy is especially notable for its descriptions of plant structure. He described nearly all the key differences of morphology of stem and root, showed that the flowers of the Asteraceae are built of multiple units, and correctly hypothesized that stamens are male organs. Anatomy of Plants also contains the first known microscopic description of pollen.

Much of Grew's pioneering work with the microscope was contemporary with that of Marcello Malpighi (b.1628-d.1694), and the two reportedly borrowed freely from one another. Grew's work on pollen was more extensive than that of Malpighi, leading to the discovery that although all pollen is roughly globular, size and shape is different between species; however, pollen grains within a species are all alike. This discovery is central to the field of palynology.

Among his other publications were Seawater made Fresh (1684), the Nature and Use of the Salt contained in Epsom and such other Waters (1697), which was a rendering of his Tractatus de salis (1693), and Cosmologia Sacra (1701).

Linnaeus named a genus of trees Grewia in his honour.

At Pembroke there is a stained-glass representation of a page of his work in the college's Library.

Grew is also considered to be one of the pioneers of dactyloscopy. He was the first person to study and describe ridges, furrows, and pores on hand and foot surfaces. In 1684, he published accurate drawings of finger ridge patterns.

Grew was a proponent of mercantilism.

== Works ==
- Grew, Nehemiah (1679). Anatomy of plants (in French). Paris: Antoine Dezallier.
- Grew, Nehemiah (1681). Musaeum Regalis Societatis. London: William Rawlins.
