= William Sampson (playwright) =

17th-century English poet and playwright

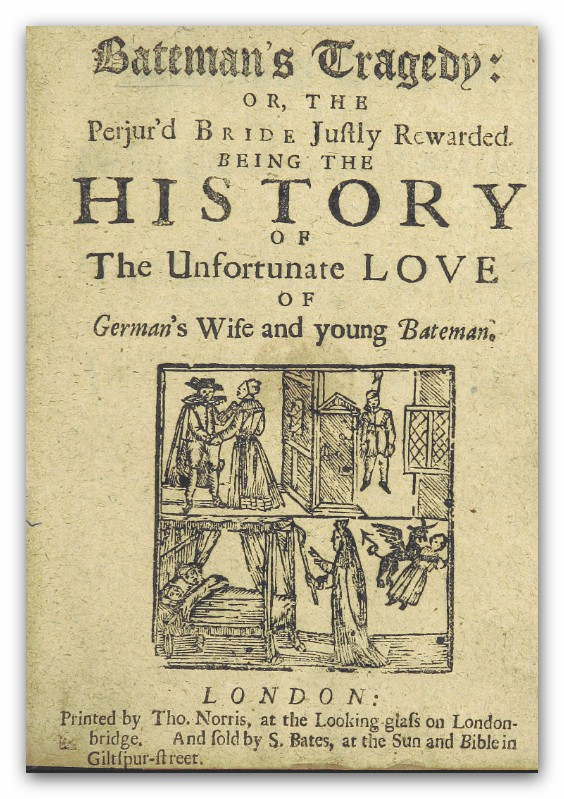
Bateman's Tragedy: or, the Perjur'd Bride justly rewarded

William Sampson (c. 1590 – c. 1636) was an English dramatist and poet.

== Life ==
Sampson is thought to have been born about 1590 at South Leverton, a village near Retford, Nottinghamshire, into a yeoman family. From early life he was in service in local households of the neighbourhood. He found a permanent position as a retainer by 1628 in the family of Sir Henry Willoughby, 1st Baronet, of Risley, Derbyshire, where Phineas Fletcher resided between 1616 and 1621.

Sampson died soon after the publication of his Virtus post Funera in 1636.

== Works ==
=== Drama ===
Sampson made the acquaintance of Gervase Markham, another Nottinghamshire author, and joined him in writing, probably about 1612, a tragedy on the story of Herod and Antipater drawn from the Antiquities of the Jews by Flavius Josephus (based on books xiv. and xv.). It was successfully produced in London, was licensed for publication on 22 February 1622, and appeared as The True Tragedy of Herod and Antipater. Markham mentioned a related play by 1612, and Sampson apparently revised it shortly before its publication. The influence of the Latin work of Josephus was mediated by a 1558 English translation by Peter Morwyng. The play itself was populist, with onstage violence and depictions of low life, and echoed some Shakespearian effects. It was acted at the Red Bull Theatre, where the audience appreciated spectacle.

Sampson followed with a play on his own, on a topic of local interest—the seduction by one Bateman of Mistress German, a young married woman of Clifton. The lovers committed suicide. The episode was the subject of a chapbook Bateman's Tragedy; or the perjured Bride justly rewarded, and there was a popular ballad on the theme (later reprinted by Joseph Ritson). Sampson's piece was written partly in blank verse and partly in prose, and was published as The Vow Breaker. A second plot involved Gervase Clifton, a local worthy, Member of Parliament and soldier serving against the Scots in 1560 at the Siege of Leith, following Holinshed's Chronicles. In the last act the mayor of Nottingham has an interview with Queen Elizabeth about the navigation of the River Trent.

A third piece, a comedy, entitled The Widow's Prize, is also attributed to Sampson. Sir Henry Herbert the licenser, on 25 January 1625, allowed it to be acted by Prince Charles's Men, conditional on some changes. In the 18th century the manuscript belonging to John Warburton was destroyed.

=== Verse ===
Later in life Sampson wrote heroic verse on the nobility and gentry of the Midland counties. In 1636 there appeared his Virtus post Funera vivit, or Honour Tryumphing over Death, being true Epitomes of Honorable, Noble, Learned, and Hospitable Personages (London, printed by John Norton, 1636). The opening lines are addressed to William Cavendish, Earl of Newcastle. There follow a prose dedication to Christian, Dowager Countess of Devon, and one in verse to Charles, son of the Earl of Newcastle. The poems—all in heroic couplets—number thirty-two. Among the persons commemorated are Elizabeth Talbot, Countess of Shrewsbury (Bess of Hardwick, No. 1), and William Cavendish, 3rd Earl of Devonshire (No. 3). A commendatory poem by Philip Kynder appeared with the work.

Sampson's efforts to attract the patronage of the Cavendishes continued. An unprinted poem by him, inscribed to Margaret Cavendish, Marchioness of Newcastle, is entitled Love's Metamorphosis, or Apollo and Daphne; it is in some 180 six-line stanzas, and is extant in Harleian MS. 6947 (No. 41, ff. 318–336). The first line runs "Scarce had Aurora showne her crimson face". Another of Sampson's poems, entitled Cicero's Loyal Epistle according to Hannibal Caro, was dedicated to Lucy Hastings, wife of Ferdinando, Lord Hastings.

== Family ==
Sampson married Helen, daughter of Gregory Vicars, and sister of John Viccars, and had by her at least two sons, Henry the physician and William, who both became fellows of Pembroke Hall, Cambridge; William (1635–1702) was later rector of Clayworth and prebendary of Lincoln from 1672. Sampson's widow in 1637 married, as her second husband, Obadiah Grew.

== Notes ==
Attribution

This article incorporates text from a publication now in the public domain: Lee, Sidney, ed. (1897). "Sampson, William (1590?-1636?)". Dictionary of National Biography. Vol. 50. London: Smith, Elder & Co.
