= John Bryan (ejected minister) =

English clergyman (??–1676)

John Bryan, D.D. (died 1676), was an English clergyman, an ejected minister of 1662.

== Life ==
Bryan was educated at Emmanuel College, Cambridge, and held the rectory of Barford, near Warwick, but left it to go to Coventry, as vicar of Trinity Church, in 1644. Bryan was appointed by Parliament, and was not cordially welcomed by the vestry.

In 1646 Bryan, assisted by Obadiah Grew, vicar of St. Michael's, held a public disputation on infant baptism in Trinity Church with Hanserd Knollys, the baptist. Though Coventry was a stronghold of puritanism, it was not so well content as were some of its preachers to witness the subversion of the monarchy. Bryan, at the end of 1646, touched upon this dissatisfaction with the course which events were taking in a sermon which was printed. The vestry in 1647 agreed to raise his stipend. In 1652 and 1654 his services were sought by Shrewsbury, and the churchwardens stirred themselves to keep him; but the citizens were less interested in discharging their promises for the support of their clergy. Nevertheless, the puritan preachers remained at their posts until the Act of Uniformity 1662 ejected them.

Bryan took very much the same view as Richard Baxter: to ministerial conformity he had ten objections, but he was willing to practise lay conformity and did so. Bishop John Hacket tried to overcome his scruples, and offered him a month to consider, beyond the time allowed by the act; but Bryan gave up his vicarage, and was succeeded by Nathaniel Wanley, author of Wonders of the Little World (1678). Bryan continued to preach whenever and wherever he had liberty to do so; and in conjunction with Grew he founded a presbyterian congregation, which met, from 1672, in licensed rooms. Bryan also educated students for the ministry, though the dissenting academy as a recognised institution dates from Richard Frankland and his Rathmell Academy (1670). Bryan was very ready in controversy, and occasionally an extempore preacher. He was fond of George Herbert's poems, and himself wrote verse. A tithe of his income he distributed in charity.

Bryan died at an advanced age on 4 March 1676. His funeral sermon, by Wanley, is a generous tribute.

== Works ==
Bryan published:

- The Vertuous Daughter, 1640, 4 (sermon, Prov. xxxi. 29), at St. Mary's, Warwick, at funeral, on 14 April 1636, of Cicely, daughter of Sir Thomas Puckering; at the end is "her epitaph by the author" in verse.
- A Discovery of the probable Sin causing this great Iudgement of Rain and Waters, viz. our Discontentment with our present Government, and inordinate desire of our King, 1647, (sermon, 1 Sam. xii. 16–20), at Coventry, on 23 Dec. 1646, being the day of public humiliation; dedication issued "from my study in Coventry" on 26 December 1646.
- The Warwickshire Ministers' Testimony to the Trueth of Jesus Christ, and to the Solemn League and Covenant; as also against the errours, heresies, and blasphemies of these times, and the toleration of them; sent in a letter to the Ministers of London, subscribers of the former testimony, 1648. Signed by Bryan, Grew, and John Herring as ministers of Coventry.
- A Publick Disputation sundry dayes at Killingworth [Kenilworth] in Warwickshire between John Bryan, &c. and John Onley, pastor of a church at Lawford, upon this question, Whether the parishes of this nation generally be true churches. Wherein are nine arguments alleged in proof of the affirmative of the question, with the answer of I. O. thereunto, together with Dr. B.'s reply, 1655. This discussion was criticised in Animadversions upon a Disputation, 1658, by John Ley.
- Dwelling with God, the interest and duty of believers, opened in eight sermons, 1670, (epistle to the reader by Richard Baxter).
- Prefatory letter to Sermon, 2 Cor. v. 20, by S. Gardner, 1672.
- Harvest-Home: being the summe of certain sermons upon Job 5, 26, one whereof was preached at the funeral of Mr. Ob. Musson, an aged godly minister of the Gospel, in the Royally licensed rooms in Coventry; the other since continued upon the subject. By J. B., D.D., late pastor of the Holy Trinity in that ancient and honourable city. The first part being a preparation of the corn for the sickle. The latter will be the reaping, shocking and inning of that corn which is so fitted, London, printed for the author, 1674. (The British Museum has two copies, both with author's corrections; ‘Ob.’ on the title-page is corrected to ‘Rich.’ (Richard Musson was ejected from the rectory of Church Langton, Leicestershire.)

== Family ==
Bryan left three sons:

1. John, M.A., vicar of Holy Cross (the abbey church), Shrewsbury, 1652; minister of St. Chad's, Shrewsbury, 27 March 1659; ejected 1662; minister of the presbyterian congregation meeting in High Street, Shrewsbury; died on 31 August 1699; buried in St. Chad's churchyard.
2. Samuel, fellow of Peterhouse, vicar of Allesley, Warwickshire; ejected in 1662; imprisoned six months in Warwick gaol for preaching at Birmingham; household chaplain at Belfast Castle to Arthur, 1st Earl of Donegal (who left him £50 a year for four years, besides his salary, in his will, dated 17 March 1674); died out of his mind, according to Edmund Calamy.
3. Noah, fellow of Peterhouse; ejected from a living at Stafford in 1662; according to Calamy died about 1667.

Bryan was succeeded as presbyterian minister at Coventry by his brother Gervase (or Jarvis), appointed to the rectory of Old Swinford, Worcestershire, in 1655; ejected 1662; lived at Birmingham till 1675, died at Coventry on 27 Dec. 1689, and was buried in Trinity Church. The liberty to meet in licensed rooms was withdrawn in 1682; but in 1687, after James II's declaration for liberty of conscience, Grew and Gervase Bryan reassembled their congregation in St. Nicholas Hall, commonly called Leather Hall.
