= Gervase Bryan =

English clergyman

- Born: c1622
- Died: 27 December 1689 (aged 67); Coventry, England
- Resting place: Holy Trinity Church, Coventry
- Children: Elizabeth (bap. 7 March 1648); John (bap. 27 Feb 1649, buried 2 Oct 1653); Samuel (bap. 12 May 1652); Paul (buried 23 Sept 1652); Gervase (bap. 27 Sept 1653); unnamed son (bap. 10 Feb 1655, buried 12 Feb 1655); Timothy (b. 3 April 1656); Humphrey (b. 3 April 1656, buried 13 Sept 1660); Prudence (b. 15 July 1657); Susanna (b. 15 Mar 1659, buried 11 Jan 1664); Simon (b. 8 June 1660, 17 Aug 1664)
- Relatives: John Bryan (ejected minister)

Gervase Bryan (c. 1622 – 27 December 1689) was an English clergyman, an ejected minister of 1662.

Gervase Bryan (also known as Jarvis or Jervis Brian) was educated at Emmanuel College, Cambridge, matriculating on 26 May 1640, graduating with BA (1643/44) and MA (1647). He died at Coventry on 27 December 1689, being buried at Holy Trinity Church, Coventry, on 31 December 1689. His son, Samuel (born 1652) at Oldswinford, Worcestershire also studied at Cambridge.

Bryan was installed as rector of St Mary's, Oldswinford in 1648 from where he was ejected in 1662. In November 1661, he was one of the ministers in Worcestershire implicated in the (probably) sham Pakington Plot and was briefly arrested alongside the supposed leader, Andrew Yarranton,

Gervase Bryan continued to live in the area being granted a licence to preach at his house in 1672. He moved to Birmingham in 1675 and then, in 1676, succeeded his brother, John, as Presbyterian minister to a congregation meeting in Coventry. The liberty to meet in licensed rooms was withdrawn in 1682; but in 1687, after James II's declaration for liberty of conscience, ministers Obadiah Grew and Gervase Bryan reassembled their congregation in St. Nicholas Hall, commonly called Leather Hall.

Church of England titles
Preceded by William Harewell	Rector of St Mary's Oldswinford; 1648 –1662	Succeeded by Robert Pierson
