= Obadiah Grew =

English nonconformist minister

Obadiah Grew (1 November 1607 – 22 October 1689) was an English nonconformist minister.

== Life ==
Grew was born at Atherstone, Warwickshire on 1 November 1607, the third son of Francis Grew and Elizabeth Denison. He was baptised the same day at the parish church of Mancetter, Warwickshire. Francis Grew was a layman, originally of good estate but impoverished by prosecutions for nonconformity in the high commission court and Star-chamber. Obadiah was educated at Reading, under his uncle, John Denison, and was admitted a student at Balliol College, Oxford, in 1624, his tutor being Richard Trimnell. He graduated B.A. on 12 February 1629, M.A. on 5 July 1632. In 1632 he was elected master of the Atherstone grammar school.

He was ordained in 1635 by Robert Wright, bishop of Coventry and Lichfield. He was probably lecturer at Atherstone, as well as master of the school. At the outbreak of the First English Civil War he sided with the parliamentary party. Among the thirty parliamentary divines who crowded into Coventry for safety in 1642 were Richard Vines, rector of Weddington, Warwickshire, and Grew, his near neighbour. Both were appointed to preach at St. Michael's Church, which the royalist vicar, William Panting, had deserted. At the end of 1643 the solemn league and covenant was taken in St. Michael's by all the parishioners. In March 1644 Grew obtained the vicarage from the city corporation. The vestry books of 1645 show some puritan changes; the old font was replaced by a new one, and the brass eagle was sold. The bells, however, were kept in order.

In 1646 Grew and John Bryan took part in a public disputation on infant baptism at Trinity Church, with Hanserd Knollys and another. Towards the end of 1648 Oliver Cromwell was in Coventry on his way to London from Scotland; Grew pleaded with him for the king's life. On 10 October 1651 he accumulated the degrees of B.D. and D.D. at Oxford. In 1654 he was made assistant to the Warwickshire commission for removing scandalous ministers. He was a member of the Kenilworth classis, which included over twenty churches. He approved the rising of the 'new royalists ' in August 1659 (see George Booth) and though threatened by John Lambert's soldiers, then holding Coventry, refused to read the proclamation against Booth, as required by authority. He welcomed the Restoration.

Unable to comply with the Act of Uniformity 1662, he resigned his living. His bishop, John Hacket, was anxious to retain him, and gave him leave to preach a month beyond the appointed day (24 August) without conforming; at the end of September he preached his farewell sermon. The corporation seems to have continued some allowance to him. In 1665, when the alarm of the plague thinned the pulpits throughout the country, Grew, like other nonconformists, began to hold public meetings for worship. The enforcement of the Five Mile Act, which took effect on 25 March 1666, compelled him to move from Coventry. He returned on the indulgence of 15 March 1672, took out a licence, and, in conjunction with Bryan, founded a presbyterian congregation. On the withdrawal of the indulgence (1673) the conventicle was connived at by the corporation in spite of Lord Arlington's remonstrances.

On Bryan's death (1675) his brother, Gervase Bryan, took his place. Grew began to train youths for the ministry, one of his pupils being Samuel Pomfret. Captain Hickman of Barnacle, Warwickshire, unsuccessfully appeared as an informer against Grew, claiming a fine of £100 in the recorder's court. At length in 1682 Grew, who had lost his eyesight, was convicted of a breach of the Five Mile Act, and imprisoned for six months in Coventry gaol. While in prison, and in his retirement from Coventry after his release, he every week dictated a sermon to an amanuensis, who read it to four or five shorthand writers, each of whom got several copies made for use in twenty clandestine meetings. On 8 January 1685 nearly two hundred persons were imprisoned at Coventry for frequenting these conventicles.

James II's declaration for liberty of conscience (11 April 1687) restored Grew to his congregation, who obtained a grant of St. Nicholas' Hall (the 'Leather Hall') in West Orchard, and fitted it up as a presbyterian meeting-house. Here Grew officiated till September 1689. He died on 22 October of that year, and was buried in the chancel of St. Michael's.

== Family ==
He married (25 December 1637) Helen (born February 1603, died 19 Oct. 1687), daughter of Gregory Vicars of Treswell, Nottinghamshire, widow of William Sampson of South Leverton, Nottinghamshire, and mother of Henry Sampson, M.D. His only son was Nehemiah Grew. He had a daughter named Mary (died 1703), who married John Willes, M.A., a nonconformist scholar (who was ordained, but never preached); after Grew’s death, he retired to his estate at Spratton, Northamptonshire.

Grew's eldest brother Jonathan (died before June 1646) was father of Jonathan Grew (1626–1711). The latter was educated at Pembroke Hall, Cambridge, was preacher at Framlingham, Suffolk, and tutor in the family of Lady Hales, first at Coventry, and afterwards at Caldecote Hall, Warwickshire. Bishop Hacket offered him in 1662 a prebend at Lichfield in addition to the rectory of Caldecote, but he declined to conform, kept a school at Newington Green, and finally became the first minister (1698–1711) of the presbyterian congregation at Dagnal Lane, St. Albans, Hertfordshire. He was buried in the abbey church there.

== Works ==
He published:

- His 'Farewell Sermon,' 1663, Acts xx. 32.
- 'A Sinner's Justification', &c.,1670, 1698, 1785 (in Welsh).
  - Obadiah Grew (1785). Cyfiawnhad pechadur: neu'r Arglwydd Jesu Grist yr Arglwydd ein Cyfiawnder, a draddodwyd mewn amryw bregethau ... At yr un y chwanegwyd traethawd byrr er ymddiffyn bedydd plant bychain, etc.
- Obadiah Grew (1670). A Sinners Justification Or The Lord Jesus Christ the Lord Our Righteousnesse: Delivered in Several Sermons. By Obadiah Grew, D.D. Late Minister of the Gospel in Coventry. Nevil Simmons, at the three Crowns at Holborn-Conduit.
- Obadiah Grew (1678). Meditations Upon Our Saviour's Parable of The Prodigal Son: Being Several Sermons on the Fifteenth Chapter of St. Luke's Gospel. S. Roycroft.
- Obadiah Grew (1803). The Believer's Justification: Or the Lord Jesus Christ the Lord Our Righteousness. Extracted from the Sermons of O. G. [By J. A. Knight.].
