= De Constantia =

Book by Justus Lipsius (1584)

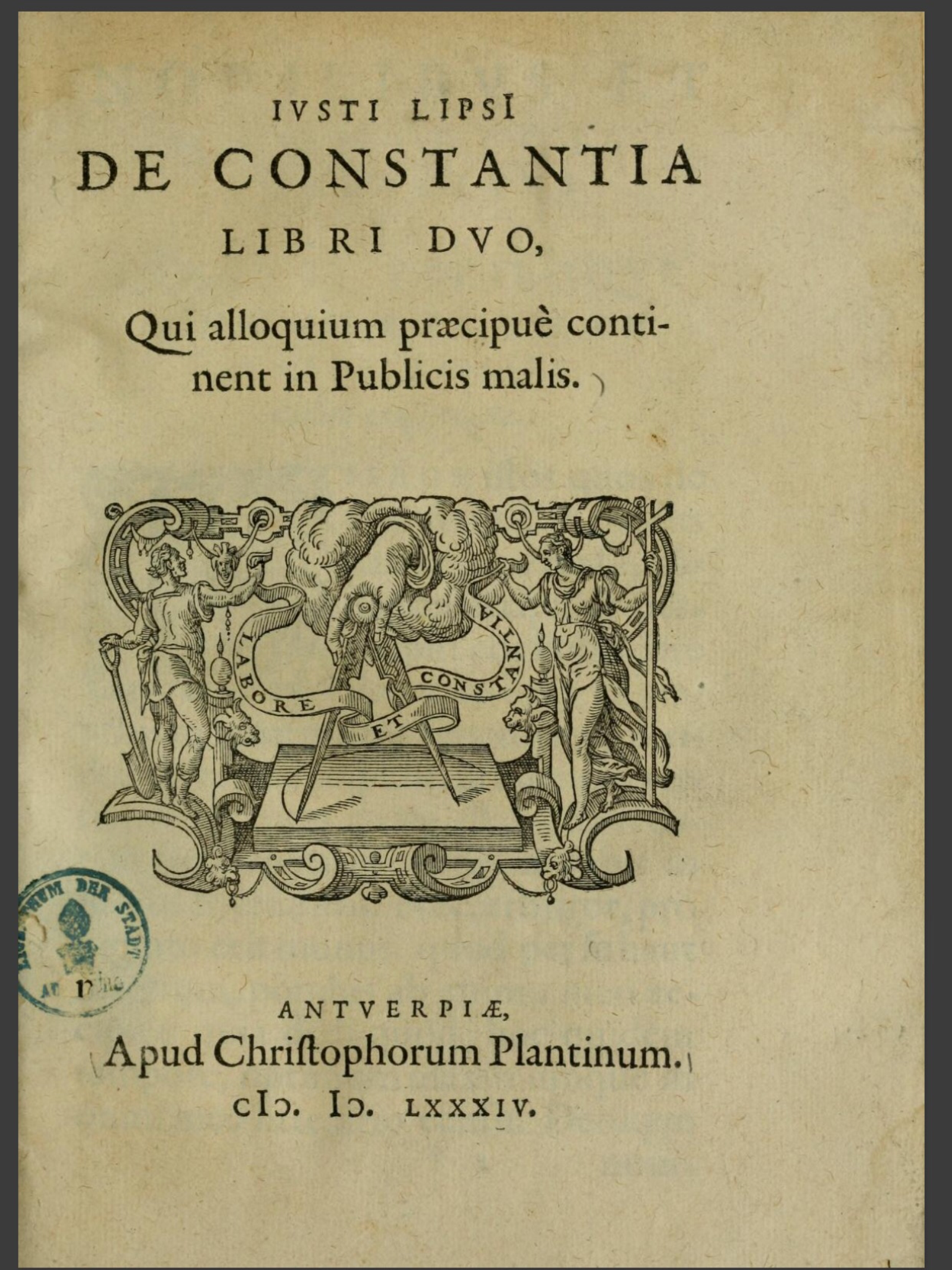
De Constantia (1584)

De Constantia in publicis malis (On Constancy in Times of Public Evil) was a philosophical dialogue published by Justus Lipsius in two books in 1583. The book, modelled after the dialogues of Seneca, was pivotal in establishing an accommodation of Stoicism and Christianity which became known as Neostoicism. De Constantia went through over eighty editions between the sixteenth and eighteenth centuries.

== Themes ==
Unlike his later books which synthesised the basic principles of Stoicism (albeit in Christianised form), in De Constantia Lipsius focuses on Stoicism's value in strengthening the mind against external troubles and anxieties. In an age of religious disputes and persecutions Lipsius intended the book to be both a consolation and a solution to the calamities which he and his contemporaries were enduring. The result is a handbook for practical living, and as such is focused more on moral rules than rigorous philosophical argument. Lipsius emphasises that the mind and the inner life is the site of true goodness. The central theme of the book is the need to cultivate voluntary and uncomplaining endurance of all human contingencies.

== Legacy ==
De Constantia was Lipsius' most popular work. Between the 16th and the 18th centuries, it went through more than eighty editions, of which over forty were in the original Latin and the rest were translations into vernacular European languages.

== English translations ==
- Two bookes of constancie, translated by Sir John Stradling, London, 1595
  - ed. with an introduction by Rudolf Kirk, notes by Clayton Morris Hall, 1939
  - ed. with an introduction & revised translation by John Sellars, Bristol Phoenix Press, 2006
- A discourse of constancy: in two books, translated by R. G., Master of Arts Sometimes Of Christ Church In Oxen, 1654
- A discourse of constancy in two books chiefly containing consolations against publick evils, translated by Nathaniel Wanley, 1670
