= The Four Philosophers =

Painting by Peter Paul Rubens

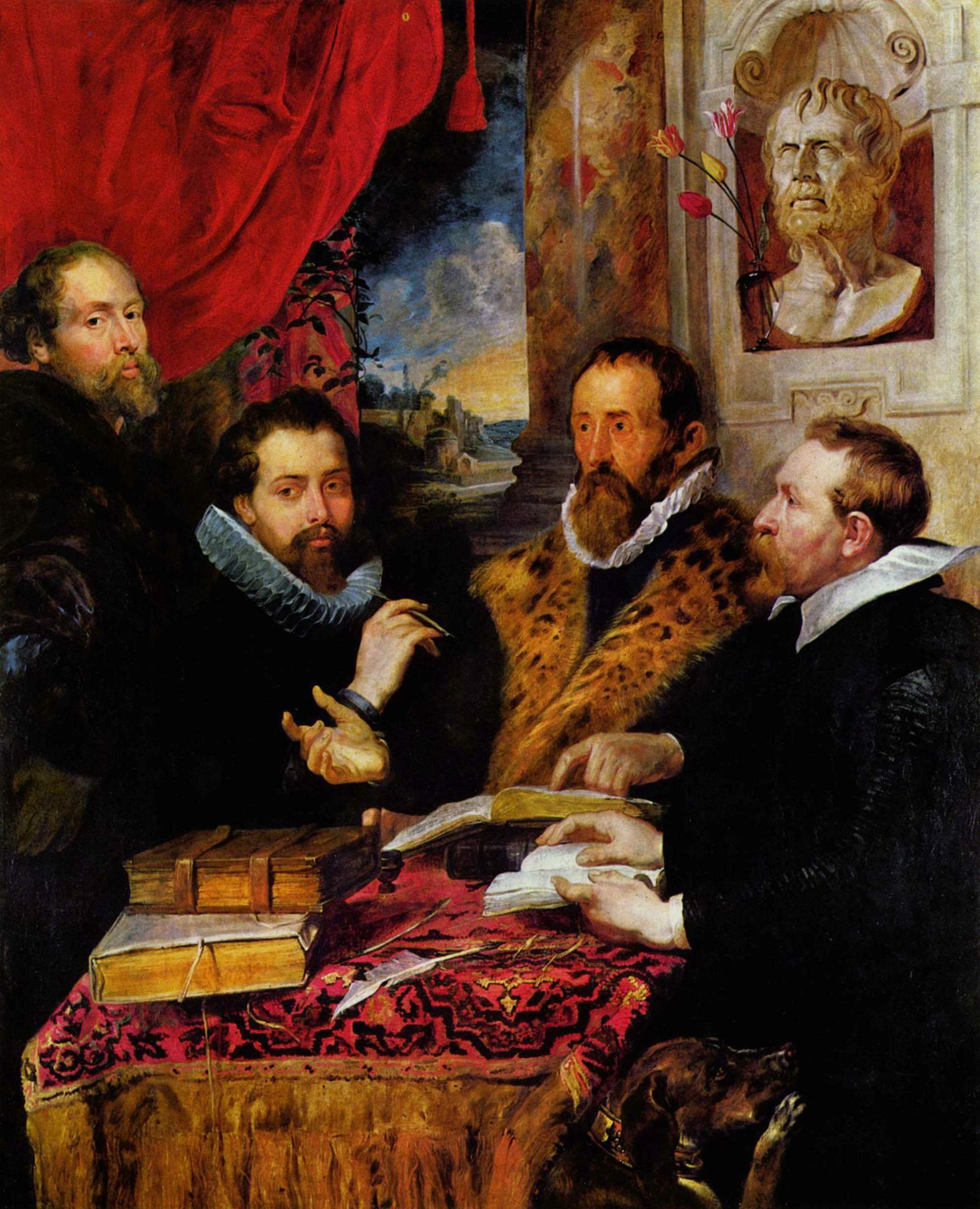
- Artist: Peter Paul Rubens
- Year: 1611–1612
- Medium: oil on panel
- Dimensions: 167 cm × 143 cm (66 in × 56 in)
- Location: Pitti Palace, Florence, Italy

The Four Philosophers is an oil painting on panel painted in 1611–12 by Peter Paul Rubens. It is now held in the Galleria Palatina of the Palazzo Pitti in Florence.

The painting is relevant to the philosophical movement of neostoicism, founded by Justus Lipsius, depicted in the painting with three of his students. Depicted from left to right are Peter Paul Rubens, Philip Rubens (the painter's brother, who died that year), Justus Lipsius, and Joannes Woverius. In the background is Peter Paul's bust of Seneca, or Pseudo Seneca, now believed to be a copy of an imaginary Hellenistic portrait of the Greek poet Hesiod.

The Four Philosophers is one of the paintings represented in the 1772 painting The Tribuna of the Uffizi by Johan Zoffany.

== Bibliography ==
- Marco Chiarini, Galleria palatina e Appartamenti Reali, Sillabe, Livorno 1998. ISBN 978-88-86392-48-8
