= Neostoicism =

16th-century philosophical movement

Neostoicism was a philosophical movement that arose in the late 16th century from the works of Justus Lipsius, and sought to combine the beliefs of Stoicism and Christianity. Lipsius was Flemish and a Renaissance humanist. The movement took on the nature of religious syncretism, although modern scholarship does not consider that it resulted in a successful synthesis. The name "neostoicism" is attributed to two Roman Catholic authors, Léontine Zanta and Julien-Eymard d'Angers.

== Background ==
John Calvin made reference to "new stoic" ideas earlier in the 16th century, but the denotation is not relevant to neostoicism. Antonio de Guevara in 1528 published a flattering biography of Marcus Aurelius, then considered a paragon of Stoic virtues.

Neostoicism is usually said to have been founded by Flemish humanist Justus Lipsius (1547–1606). It was in some aspects anticipated by Giphanius (Hubert van Giffen), who had in common with Lipsius the publisher Christophe Plantin. Plantin published the Lucretius edition (1565) by Giphanius, and his circle entertained related ideas with some influence of Lucretius.

Plantin is considered to have had Familist connections. More definitely, Nicolette Mout takes it to be likely that Lipsius was involved with a Hiëlist group. The relevance to neostoicism lies in the Nicodemism of this Familist fraction.

Lucretius was an author from the Epicurean school, and Epicureanism has traditionally been considered as antipodal to Stoicism. In fact, however, the Epicurean and Stoic schools had in common a material and deterministic view of natural philosophy. They differed on ethics. It was the discrimination made by Lipsius, that the materialism and determinism of the Stoics should be largely rejected, that opened up the possibility to present a neostoicism more compatible with Christian beliefs. The later Fundamenta juris gentium et naturae of Christian Thomasius was a comparable project with an Epicurean basis.

== Origins of neostoicism ==
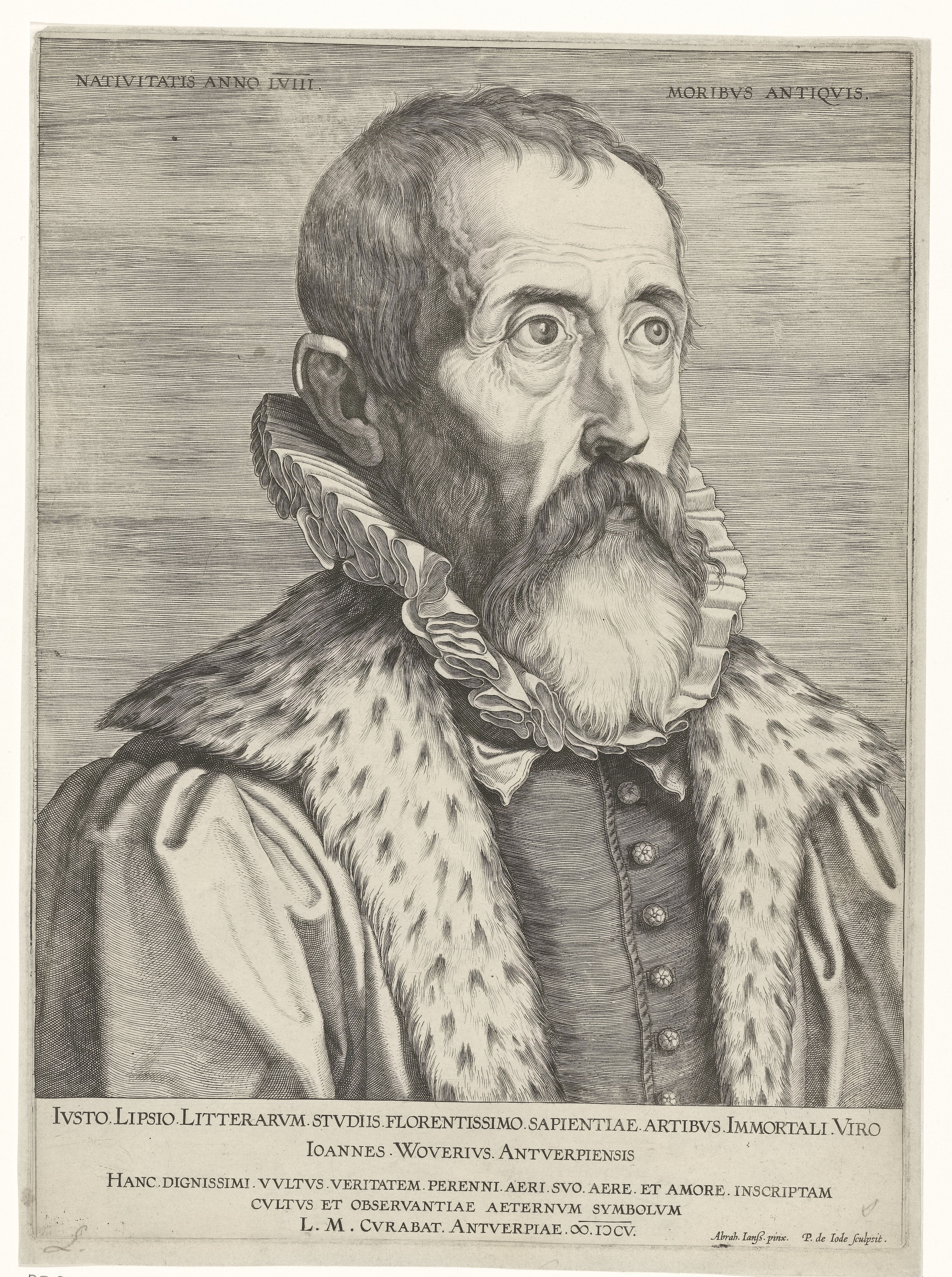
Justus Lipsius, the founder of neostoicism

During his time in the Northern Netherlands (Leiden, 1578–1591), Lipsius published his two most significant works: De Constantia ("On Constancy", 1583, full title De constantia libri duo qui alloquium praecipue continent in publicis malis) and Politicorum sive Civilis doctrinae libri sex (1589), short name Politica. De constantia sets out the foundation for neostoic thought. It is a dialogue between the characters Lipsius and Langius (based on his friend, Charles de Langhe). They explore aspects of contemporary political predicaments by reference to the classical Greek and pagan Stoicism, in particular, that found in the writings of Seneca the Younger.

At this period Stoic teachings were known mainly through the Latin authors Cicero and Seneca, who had concentrated on Stoic ethics. Both Lipsius and Michel de Montaigne found interesting in Seneca the treatment of the concepts of apatheia and ataraxia, largely to the exclusion of Cicero's handling of Stoic ethical concepts, and innovated with an emphasis on self-preservation and management of the passions. Montaigne, however, became more of an opponent of Stoicism, a development towards scepticism that Charles Larmore regards as gradual and linked to his writing of the Essays.

Lipsius was introduced to Seneca by Muretus, a celebrated stylist of humanist Latin, who wrote that some of Stoic doctrine was foolishness. Lipsius, on the other hand, took an interest in reconciling Christian and Stoic morality, bringing in the writings of Epictetus. He did so during the early years of the Eighty Years' War, and in response to the troubled times in the Low Countries it caused. His systematised version had standing for some two centuries. Both Lipsius and his reading of Seneca provoked criticisms of Stoicism in general, which later scholarship has countered by the recovery of original Stoic texts.

As Sellars puts it, "a Neostoic is a Christian who draws on Stoic ethics, but rejects those aspects of Stoic materialism and determinism that contradict Christian teaching." Lipsius further developed neostoicism in his treatises Manuductionis ad stoicam philosophiam (Introduction to Stoic Philosophy) and Physiologia stoicorum (Stoic Physics), both published in 1604. Jonathan Israel considers these works to be appeals to Netherlanders to reject patriotism and confessional zealotry, instead working within a moral and political framework around peaceful actions and preservation of good order. The setting has led to neostoicism, which became fashionable, being labelled a "crisis philosophy".

== Neo-stoic authors ==
The work of Guillaume du Vair, Traité de la Constance (1594), was another important influence in the neo-stoic movement. Where Lipsius had mainly based his work on the writings of Seneca, du Vair emphasized Epictetus.

Pierre Charron came to a neo-stoic position through the impact of the French Wars of Religion. He made a complete separation of morality and religion.

== Neo-stoic practical philosophy ==
The project of neostoicism has been described as an attempt by Lipsius to construct "a secular ethics based on Roman Stoic philosophy." He did not endorse religious toleration in an unqualified way: hence the importance of a morality not tied to religion. Bement wrote:

No rigidly consistent doctrine emerges from the neostoic revival, but two important strains develop, one confirming the contemporary predilection for the active life, the other finding expression in retreat and isolation from the world.

According to Hiller,

Lipsius utilized both Seneca and Tacitus to create a coherent system for the management of public and private life in war-torn northern Europe.

In the introduction to his Politica, Lipsius defined its aim as addressing rulers, where De constantia was for those who should obey and endure. Neostoicism allowed for authoritarian enforcement of order, and the use of force. Papy writes in the Stanford Encyclopedia of Philosophy

Lipsius's lifelong project was to transform contemporary moral philosophy through a new reading of the Roman Stoic philosopher Seneca, while also revitalizing contemporary political practice by drawing on the insights provided by the Roman historian Tacitus.

This statement leaves open the question of the relationship of Tacitus to neostoicism. A conventional answer given by Waszink is that Tacitus serves as a source of "examples and guidelines for the modern prince and subject." Waszink also considers, however, that the argument of the Politica, and its practical philosophy, can be understood without the Stoic connections.

Neostoicism held that the basic rule of good life is that a person should not yield to the passions, but submit to God. A way to this teaching was an equation made in Physiologia Stoicorum between fate (fortuna) and divine providence. The intended sense of "constancy" in Lipsius is "calm acceptance of the inevitable." But in fact in De Constantia Lipsius follows Boethius (Consolations of Philosophy Book IV) and later Christian teachings to distinguish between divine providence and fate, the prima causa in nature. Lipsius there argued for fate as a by-product of divine providence, and for free will.

The Stoic view was that acting on passions amounted to faulty reasoning. Consequently, the control of the passions came down to reasoning more correctly, avoiding mistakes they could cause. Calm can be achieved because material pleasures and sufferings are irrelevant.

== Influence ==
Lipsius was a humanist leader of international reputation, and numerous identifiable followers. He corresponded with hundreds of other humanists.

=== Views of the Lipsius circle ===
Scholarship recognises a "Lipsius circle". The terms "Lipsian" and "Lipsianism" are used, the latter in reference in particular to his influence in Central and Eastern Europe. Waszink notes that "Lipsian" at times is used as if it were a synonym for "neostoic" while covering all the thought of Lipsius.

Maurice De Wulf writing in his Histoire de la philosophie médiévale (1900) took the view that Lipsius was an erudite rather than a philosopher, founded no school, and had few disciples, mentioning only Caspar Schoppe. In contrast Richard Tuck described (1993) the effort of Benito Arias Montano, a Familist collaborator of Plantin and long-term friend and correspondent of Lipsius, as influencing in Spain Pedro de Valencia and engaged in theoretical work to go beyond the "Stoicism and scepticism of the Lipsian circle".

Aside from neostoicism, Lipsius impressed others also with his Latin style, scholarly editions and political thinking. Charles Nauert casts doubt on whether there was a broad-based movement attached to neostoicism, commenting on "revived forms of ancient philosophy", including voguish neostoicism as the essence of Roman "moral earnestness", that none "gained a profound hold on the conscience of more than a few scattered individuals." In the first chapter of his book Philosophic Pride: Stoicism and Political Thought from Lipsius to Rousseau, Brooke questions whether as much of the political thought of Lipsius should be attributed definitely to neostoicism as had been asserted by Gerhard Oestreich.

=== Literature ===
Neostoicism had a direct influence on later writers, particularly in Spain and England. Among Spanish writers there were Francisco de Quevedo, and Juan de Vera y Figueroa, among English writers Francis Bacon and Joseph Hall. Later in France there were Montesquieu and Bossuet. According to Saarinen, neo-stoic ideas are relevant to many Calvinist authors, of whom he mentions Theodor Zwinger.

==== In the Habsburg Monarchy ====
Francisco Sánchez de las Brozas promoted neostoicism in Spain, as an editor of an Epictetus edition published in 1600. Later Quevedo published his Doctrina Estoica (1635), continuing efforts to bridge the gap between Stoicism and Christian beliefs. Virgilio Malvezzi, called "the Seneca of the Italian language" by Benedetto Croce, was a member of the Italian coterie at Philip IV's court during this same period.

During the lifetime of Lipsius, the Habsburg monarchy, which included the Spanish Netherlands, had capitals at Madrid and Prague. Lipsius was widely read in Bohemia and Hungary. Rudolf II, Holy Roman Emperor did not approve of the warlike Spanish policy in the Netherlands, thought of as within the Empire, of Philip II of Spain. Zdeněk Vojtěch Popel z Lobkovic (1568–1628) read much in Lipsius. Nicolaus Vernulaeus who became historiographer to Ferdinand III, Holy Roman Emperor drew in his Institutiones politicae on neostoicism and its revised version by Adam Contzen, a Jesuit follower of Lipsius. János Rimay was a Hungarian neo-stoic poet interested in a national revival in Hungary.

==== In England ====
Translations into English of basic neostoic works by Lipsius and Du Vair appeared in the 1590s, and Thomas Lodge translated Seneca's moral works (1614). The translation of the De constantia by Sir John Stradling, 1st Baronet was well received in aristocratic circles.

Joseph Hall's 1606 book Heaven upon Earth (1606) adopted "the fashionable vogue for neo-Stoicism". It was published the year after a visit to the Netherlands Hall made as chaplain to Sir Edmund Bacon. Hall's biographer Huntley comments that his neostoicism "is more Christian than Senecan", and that he also uses Ramism.

Kevin Sharpe, in his study of the reading of Sir William Drake, 1st Baronet, noted that both reading and a stay in the Netherlands "appear to have led him to be influenced by the fashionable neostoicist humanist writings of Justus Lipsius and his disciples." Sharpe mentions also that Sir Roger Townshend, 1st Baronet had a work by Lipsius in his library. John Eliot in the Tower of London, and frustrated with politics, around 1630 acquired the De constantia.

Edward Herbert of Cherbury built on neostoicism an early system of deism. Thomas Gataker published in 1652 an edition of the Meditations of Marcus Aurelius with a large Biblical apparatus intended for Christian readers.

=== Dutch social culture ===
The ground for neostoicism's emphasis on moderation and self-control had been prepared by Erasmus. It has been regarded as a joint effect of Calvinism and Renaissance humanism. Post-Lipsius and the requirements of public life in a time of crises ruled by fate, there were the basic ideas of living by virtue and values, disabused of worldly wisdom and superficials. Related themes were found in Jacob Cats, Dirck Coornhert and Pieter Corneliszoon Hooft.

=== The arts ===
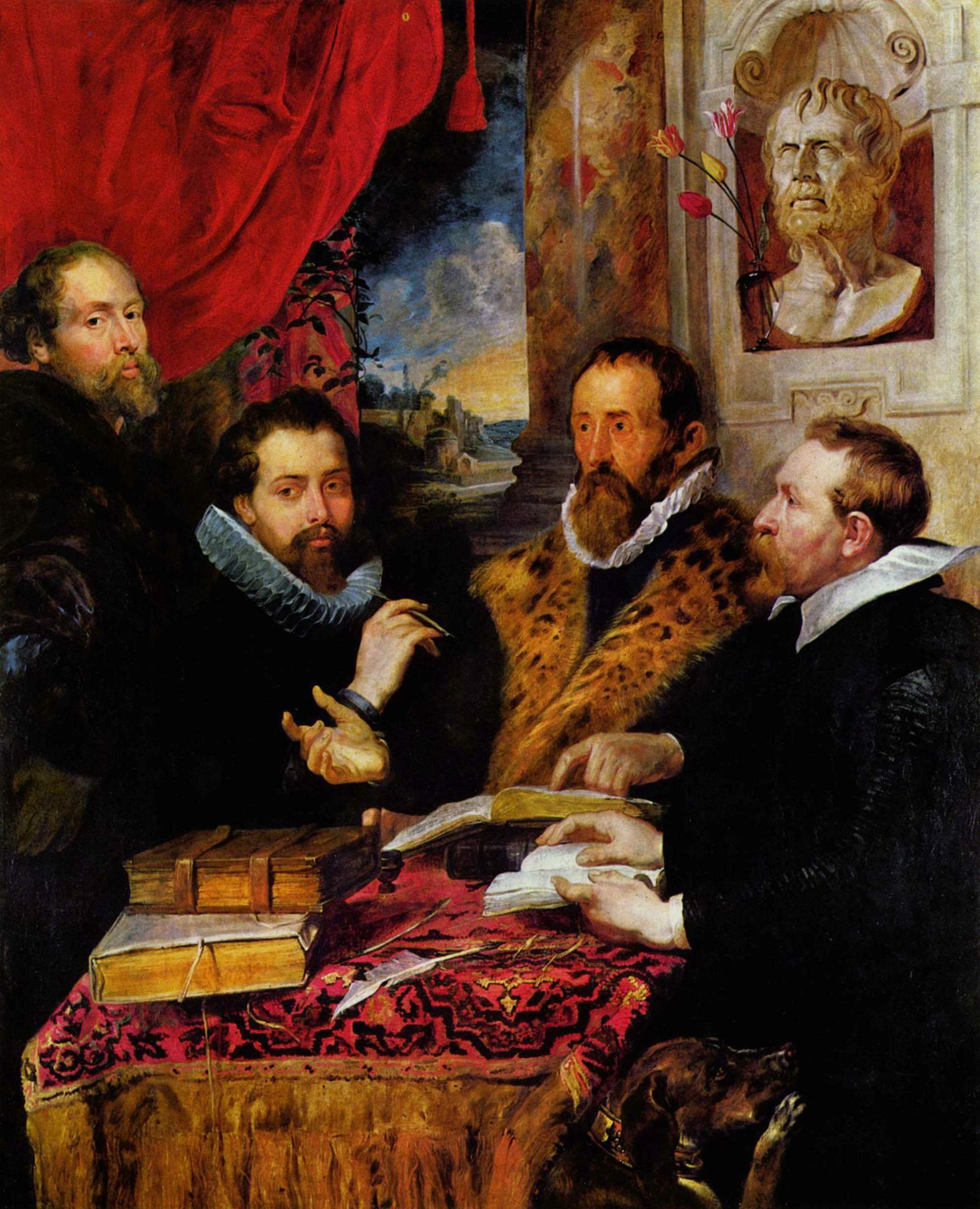
The Four Philosophers by Peter Paul Rubens (1611–12); Pitti Palace, Florence

Neo-stoic attitudes could be illustrated in history painting, by choice of exemplars, for instance taken from the Roman Republic. It was also seen in portraiture of royalty and nobility: "the full-length or three-quarter-length lifesize format, the static pose, and the impassive facial expression associated with the characterological ideal of neo-Stoicism." In the Dutch Republic of the 17th-century these were current techniques to show virtù.

The painter Peter Paul Rubens was a disciple and friend of Lipsius. In his painting The Four Philosophers, there is a self-portrait as Lipsius teaches two seated students, Joannes Woverius and his brother Philip. Philip was a pupil whom Lipsius "loved like a son", and who had presented Lipsius' book on Seneca to Pope Paul V. Lipsius chose Wolverius to be his executor. In the background is a bust belonging to Rubens, at the time thought to be of Seneca: it is now believed to represent the Greek poet Hesiod.

Rubens and Anthony van Dyck were certainly familiar with the neo-stoic principles, but the only North Netherlands painter of the time known to have taken them more seriously was Gerrit van Honthorst. Joseph Justus Scaliger influenced literary figures such as Samuel Coster. Scaliger was the major rival of Lipsius, and his successor at the University of Leiden. The original thinking became attenuated by the later 17th-century.

The "grand manner" employed in the 1640s paintings of Nicolas Poussin was influenced by the basic neo-stoic ideas of Lipsius.

Neostoicism had an impact on garden design: the dialogue in the De constantia by Lipsius was set in his own garden, and he moralised it. Studies have connected Dutch 17th-century gardens and John Maurice, Prince of Nassau-Siegen with neo-stoic ideas; Allan has written on the effect of Lipsius's view, that Stoic prudentia is to be achieved from a garden in which to contemplate, on Scottish gardens of the same period.

=== Military doctrine ===
According to Israel, the 1590s were a decade of preoccupation in the Dutch Republic with order and discipline in its armed forces. William Louis, Count of Nassau-Dillenburg proposed in 1594 the volley fire technique with alternating infantry ranks. The humanist ideas around neostoicism reinforced the trend to greater discipline. Peter Burke writes "The self-discipline recommended by Seneca and Lipsius was transformed into military discipline in the age of drill."

Lipsius published a study of the Roman army, De Militia Romana (1595–96), which was influential in a number of European countries. It appeared in the South Netherlands, dedicated to Prince Philip, heir to the Spanish throne. But Lipsius was familiar also with leaders of the Dutch Revolt, and both sides in the struggle at this time were tightening up their military. Burke comments that "It is no accident that Lipsius should have been attracted to the study of both stoicism and the Roman army.

== Further developments ==
There are parallels between the political thought of Lipsius and that of Giovanni Botero, author of The Reason of State. Lipsius himself did not contribute to an ongoing debate over "reason of state" and national interest, but it took natural steps from his concept of prudentia mixta (mixed prudence). It grew in the same climate of development based on scepticism, Tacitus and the thought of Machiavelli from which his political ideas and military doctrines arose.

The new attitude to military discipline seen with William the Silent, as an aspect of neostoicism, has been extrapolated by Charles Taylor. He argues that it applied in civil government also, as an aspect of absolutism, and is seen in the self-mastery of Descartes.

The beginnings of Enlightenment history of philosophy were bound up with reactions to the ideas of Baruch Spinoza, questions about the extent to which they were repackaged Stoicism, and serious criticism of the Christianising approach of Renaissance humanists to ancient Greek thought. Jakob Thomasius, Jean Le Clerc and Pierre Bayle found the neostoicism of Lipsius a serious distortion of the Greek Stoics, with imposed spirituality and neoplatonism. It was deemed a selective use of sources.

== See also ==
- Christian asceticism
- Christianity and Hellenistic philosophy
- Christian philosophy
- Cynicism
