= Joannes Woverius =

Royal office-holder in the Spanish Netherlands

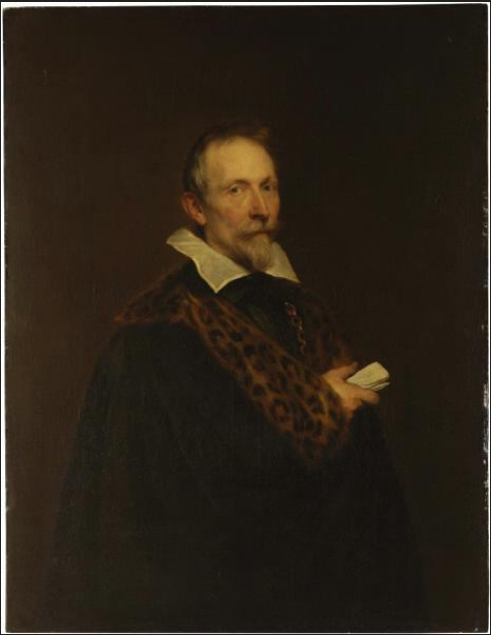
A portrait of Woverius by Anthony van Dyck, c. 1632

Joannes Woverius (1576-1636), the Latinized name of Jan van den Wouwer, was a civic and royal office-holder in the Spanish Netherlands.

== Life ==
Born in Antwerp in 1576, Woverius studied at Leuven University under Justus Lipsius, lodging in the professor's house. He went on to study in France, Spain and Italy, where he made the acquaintance of Peter Paul Rubens and his brother, Philip. After returning to the Low Countries he served as an alderman on Antwerp city council. In 1620 was appointed a councillor to the government of the Archdukes Albrecht and Isabella in Brussels.

He was married to Maria Clarisse.

In 1611-1612, Rubens painted The Four Philosophers, a group portrait of himself, his brother, Justus Lipsius, and Woverius. After Lipsius's death, Woverius ensured the posthumous publication of his editions of the works of Seneca the Younger and Tacitus, as well as two volumes of Lipsius's letters.
