= John Viccars =

English linguist and biblical scholar

John Viccars (1604–1653?) was an English linguist and biblical scholar.

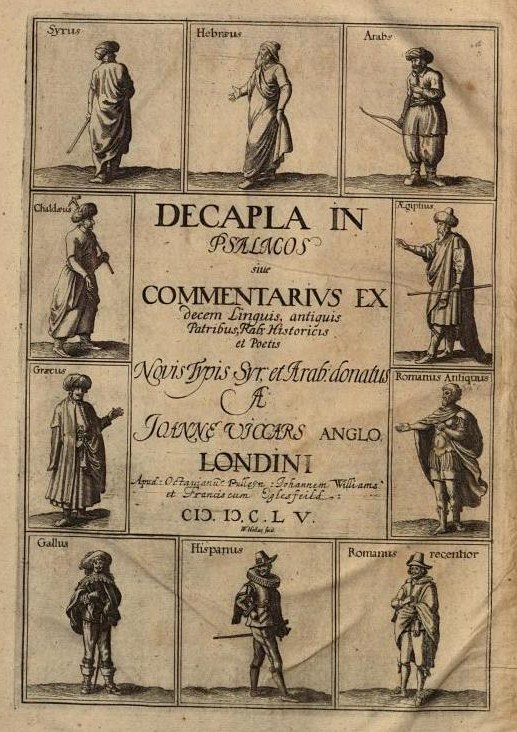
Frontispiece by Wenceslaus Hollar from the second edition (1655) of Decapla in Psalmos: sive Commentarius ex decem Linguis, by John Viccars

== Life ==
The elder son of Gregory Viccars of Treswell in Nottinghamshire, he was baptised there on 30 October 1604; his sister Helen was the wife of the dramatist William Sampson. He was educated at Christ's College, Cambridge, where he graduated B.A. in 1622. He was incorporated B.A. at Oxford on 24 February 1625, graduated M.A. at Lincoln College on 28 March 1625, and was incorporated M.A. at Cambridge the same year.

In 1627 Viccars became vicar of St Mary's Church, Stamford; but in 1628 some of the congregation accused him of heresy. Brought before the Court of High Commission in 1631, he was defrocked, fined and imprisoned. In 1635 he recanted, and re-entered the ministry. He went abroad, on scholarly travels.

In 1640 Viccars was presented to the rectory of South Fambridge in Essex. He held it until 1646, when he was sequestered by the Westminster Assembly of divines.

Viccars is mentioned in connection with Brian Walton's London Polyglot in 1652, but not subsequently. He may therefore have died around 1653.

== Works ==
Viccars' major work is a multilingual psalm commentary, Decapla in Psalmos: sive Commentarius ex decem Linguis (London, 1639) in Hebrew, Arabic, Syriac, Rabbinic, Chaldean, Greek, Latin, Italian, Spanish, and French. In the early 1640s he composed three political tracts published as 'J. V. Prisoner' (a reference to his prison term in the previous decade): Discovery of the Rebels, The Great Antichrist, and The Opinion of the Roman Judges (all printed 1643). These works, which were previously attributed to the presbyterian poet and chronicler John Vicars, propagated Viccars' royalist, Laudian views in defence of liturgical tradition as the English Civil War began.

== Notes ==
Attribution

This article incorporates text from a publication now in the public domain: Lee, Sidney, ed. (1899). "Viccars, John". Dictionary of National Biography. Vol. 58. London: Smith, Elder & Co.
