= Robert Pierson (minister) =

- Died: January 1673; Oldswinford, Worcestershire
- Resting place: St Mary’s Church, Oldswinford, Worcestershire
- Other names: Robert Pearson, Robert Peirson, Robert Peirsome
- Children: Anne Pierson (bap. 27 July 1663, buried 8 Nov 1671); Joshua Pierson (bap. 15 Oct 1665, buried 6 Sept 1666); Stephen Pierson (buried 14 April 1666); Elizabeth Pierson (bap. 20 Oct 1667); Samuel Pierson (bap. 18 Feb 1671, buried 19 July 1672)

Robert Pierson (buried 23 January 1673) was rector of St Mary's, Oldswinford, Worcestershire.

Robert Pierson is largely undocumented, being omitted from Nash's list of rectors of St Mary's, Oldswinford. The two sources for his life are the parish records of his last church and the writings of the Puritan historian Edmund Calamy.

Robert Pierson succeeded Gervase Bryan as rector of St Mary's, Oldswinford in 1665 after the latter was ejected in 1662. He died in post and was buried in his churchyard on 14 January 1675.

According to Calamy (a somewhat partial historian), Pierson had Puritan sympathies both showing sympathy for his predecessor (who remained in Oldswinford after his ejection) and expressing regret at his own decision to conform. Calamy also reports that Pierson offended some of his parishioners by criticising the deceased and suffered ill health while preaching which eventually led to his death.

Pierson was one of the founder feoffes [trustees] of Old Swinford Hospital school, founded by Pierson's patron, Thomas Foley (died 1677).

Church of England titles
Preceded by Gervase Bryan	Rector of St Mary's Oldswinford; 1662 –1673	Succeeded by Edward Ecclestone
