= The State of Innocence =

Dramatic adaptation by Dryden of Paradise Lost

The State of Innocence and Fall of Man: An Opera
- Title page (1678 reprint)
- Author: John Dryden
- Language: Early Modern English
- Genre: Opera, tragedy
- Publication date: 1677
- Publication place: Kingdom of England

The State of Innocence is a dramatic work by John Dryden, originally intended as the libretto for an opera. Written around 1673–4, it was first published in 1677. The work is a rhymed adaptation of John Milton's epic poem Paradise Lost and retells the Biblical story of the fall of man.

== Composition ==
Dryden was an admirer of Milton's, and described Paradise Lost as "one of the greatest, most noble and most sublime poems which either this Age or Nation has produc'd". According to John Aubrey, Milton gave Dryden his personal permission to adapt the poem:

[Dryden] went to him to have leave to put his Paradise Lost into a Drama in Rhyme. Mr. Milton received him civilly, and told him that he would give him leave to tag his verses.

This reference to the metal "tags" affixed to the ends of cords or laces may hint at Milton's contempt of rhyme as something purely fashionable and ornamental.

Dryden's work, originally titled The Fall of Angels and Man in Innocence: An Heroic Opera, was completed within the space of a month, but the intended opera was never produced. Unofficial transcripts of the libretto began to circulate, however, and the errors in these copies so annoyed Dryden that he was finally induced, in 1677, to publish an authorised version.

== Style ==
The State of Innocence is a five-act drama, chiefly focusing on Books 2, 4, 8 and 9 of Milton's poem. The dialogue and soliloquies are written mostly in heroic couplets, although one section is written in blank verse. The opening lines, spoken by Lucifer, provide an example of Dryden's style:

Is this the seat our conqueror has given?
And this the climate we must change for heaven?
These regions and this realm my wars have got;
This mournful empire is the loser's lot;
In liquid burnings, or on dry to dwell,
Is all the sad variety of hell.

== Reception ==
While Paradise Lost had met with a cold reception upon its first publication, The State of Innocence was a great success, and was reprinted more often during Dryden's lifetime than any of his other plays. A poem by Nathaniel Lee, attached to the first edition of the libretto, cast Dryden as the "mighty genius" who had refined Milton's "rough" work.

Modern criticism has been less favourable, with critics disapproving of Dryden's alterations to both the literary form and the political message of Milton's poem. To modern eyes, as Dustin Griffin writes, "Dryden's deviation from his original is a measure of his failure".
