= Justus Lipsius =

Flemish philologist, philosopher and humanist (1547–1606)

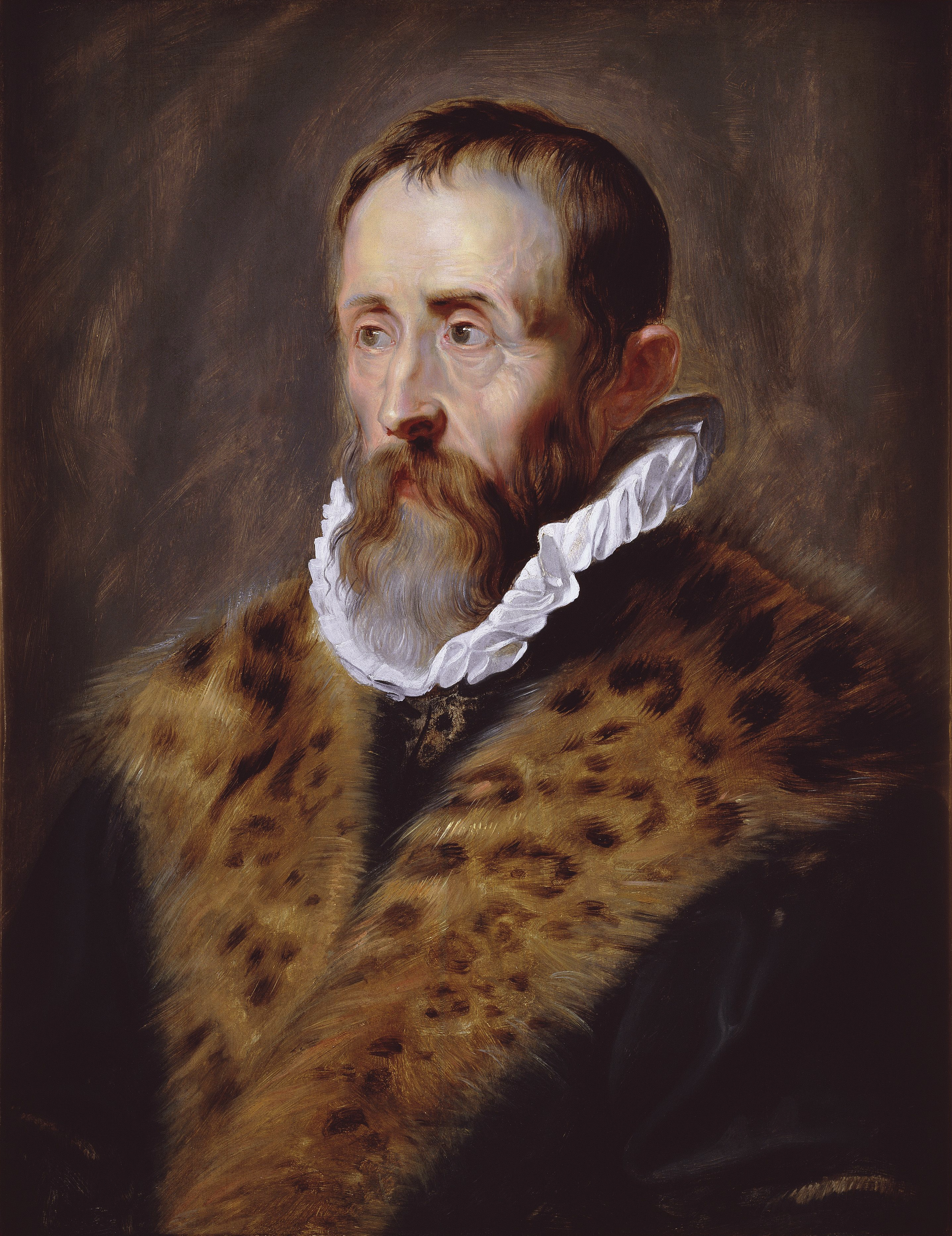
- Born: Joest Lips; October 18, 1547; Overijse, Spanish Netherlands
- Died: March 23, 1606 (aged 58); Leuven, Spanish Netherlands

Education
- Education: Catholic University of Louvain

Philosophical work
- Era: Renaissance philosophy
- Region: Western philosophy
- School: Neostoicism; Renaissance humanism
- Institutions: Leiden University (1578–1591)
- Notable students: Hugo Grotius; Erycius Puteanus
- Notable works: De Constantia (1583)

Justus Lipsius (born Joest Lips; October 18, 1547 – March 23, 1606) was a Flemish philologist, philosopher, and Christian humanist. Lipsius wrote a series of works designed to revive ancient Stoicism in a form that would be compatible with Christianity. The most famous of these is De Constantia (On Constancy). His form of Stoicism influenced a number of contemporary thinkers, creating the intellectual movement of Neostoicism. He taught at the universities in Jena, Leiden, and Leuven.

== Early life ==
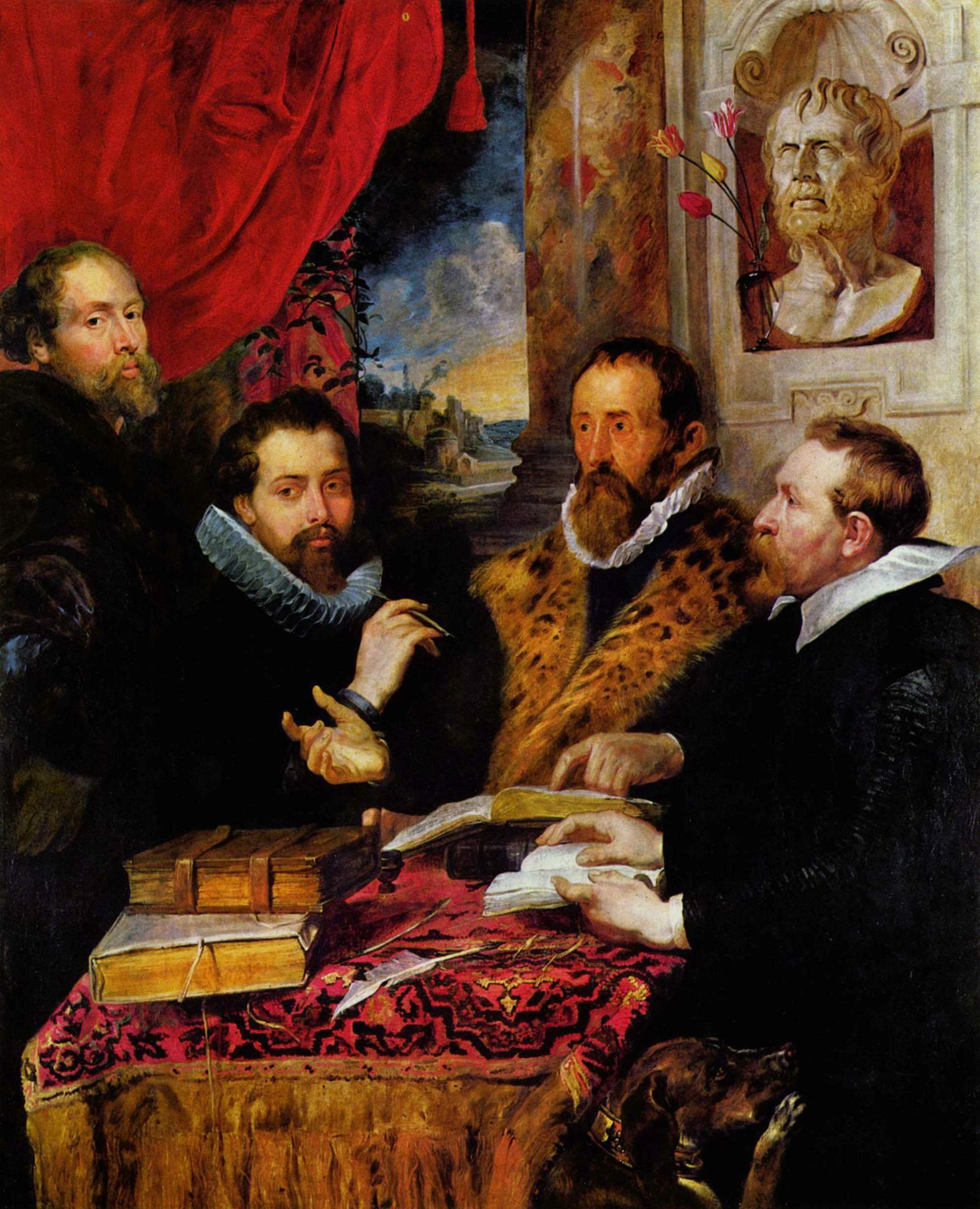
The Four Philosophers (c. 1615; oil on panel; 167 x 143 cm, Pitti Palace, Florence). One of Lipsius's students was Philip Rubens, the brother of the painter Peter Paul Rubens. In his friendship portrait of about 1615, the painter depicted himself, his brother, Lipsius and Jan van den Wouwer, another pupil of Lipsius, (left to right) along with Lipsius' dog Mopsulus. A bust of Seneca behind the philosopher references his work, while the ruins of Rome's Palatine Hill in the background further commemorate the classical influences. Rubens painted a similar friendship portrait while in Mantua around 1602 (now in the Wallraf-Richartz Museum, Cologne) that also includes Lipsius.

Lipsius was born in Overijse, Brabant (in modern Belgium). His parents sent him early to the Jesuit college in Cologne, but they feared that he might become a member of the Society of Jesus, so when he was sixteen they removed him to the University of Leuven in Leuven.

The publication of his Variarum Lectionum Libri Tres (1567), which he dedicated to Cardinal Granvelle, earned him an appointment as a Latin secretary, and a visit to Rome in the retinue of the cardinal. Here Lipsius remained for two years, devoting his spare time to the study of the Latin classics, collecting inscriptions and examining manuscripts in the Vatican. After he returned from Rome, he published a second volume of miscellaneous criticism (Antiquarum Lectionum Libri Quinque, 1575); compared with the Variae Lectiones of eight years earlier, it shows that he had advanced from the notion of purely conjectural emendation to that of emending by collation.

== Academic career ==
In 1570 he travelled through Burgundy, Germany, Austria, and Bohemia, where the University of Jena engaged him as a teacher for more than a year, a position which implied conformity to the Lutheran Church. On his way back to Leuven, he stopped some time in Cologne, where he must have comported himself as a Catholic.

He then returned to Leuven, but the Eighty Years' War soon drove him to take refuge via Antwerp to the Northern Netherlands, where, in 1579, the newly founded University of Leiden appointed him professor of history. He held the position of rector of the university for four terms and was a driving force behind the growth and innovation in the early years.

The eleven years that Lipsius spent in Leiden were the period of his greatest productivity. It was during this time that he prepared his Seneca, and perfected, in successive editions, his Tacitus, and brought out a series of other works. Some were pure scholarship, some were collections from classical authors, and others were of general interest. One of this latter class was a treatise on politics (Politicorum Libri Sex, 1589), in which he showed that, though a public teacher in a country which professed toleration, he had not departed from the state maxims of Alva and Philip II. He wrote that a government should recognize only one religion, and extirpate dissent by fire and sword. This avowal exposed him to attacks, but the prudent authorities of Leiden saved him, by prevailing upon him to publish a declaration that his expression Ure, seca ("Burn and cut") was a metaphor for a vigorous treatment.

== Later life ==
The Justus Lipsius Commemorative Coin

In the spring of 1590, leaving Leiden under pretext of taking the waters in Spa, he went to Mainz, where he reconciled with the Roman Catholic Church. This event deeply interested the Catholic world, and invitations from the courts and universities of Italy, Austria and Spain poured in on Lipsius. But he preferred to remain in his own country, and he finally settled in Leuven, as professor of Latin in the Collegium Buslidianum. In 1591 he undertook a grand tour of France, Italy and Germany with his young friend and later Amsterdam burgomaster Jacob Dircksz de Graeff.

He was not expected to teach, and appointments as privy councillor and historiographer royal to King Philip II of Spain eked out his trifling stipend. He continued to publish dissertations as before, the chief being his De militia romana (1595) and his Lovanium (1605), intended as an introduction to a general history of Brabant.

Lipsius died in Leuven, at the age of 58.

== Legacy ==
The former headquarters of the European Council (2004–2017) and the Council of the European Union (1995–2017), the Justus Lipsius building, bears his name, having been constructed over the site of Rue Juste Lipse, which linked Rue Belliard to Rue de la Loi in the European Quarter of Brussels. The building is still used by both institutions for offices and low-level meetings and so Justus Lipsius features heavily in the EU-lexicon.

In 2006, he was selected to appear on the 10 euro Justus Lipsius Silver commemorative Coin, minted by Belgium. The reverse side of the coin shows his portrait together with the years of his life (1547–1606).

One of the main buildings of Leiden University which serve as the Faculty of Humanities was named after Lipsius.

== Political thinking ==
The German historian Gerhard Oestreich has argued that Lipsius's ideas about the ideal citizen, a man who acts according to reason, is answerable to himself, is in control of his emotions, and is ready to fight, had found wide acceptance in the turbulent times of the Reformation. The Lipsian view, translated to politics, would have been at the basis of rationalisation of the state and its apparatus of government, autocratic rule by the prince, discipline dispensed to subjects, and strong military defence. The principles would have laid the foundation for military revolution that transformed first European warfare and then the internal organisation of the European states themselves. These conclusions of Oestreich have met with some scepticism in the academic community, and the notion that Lipsius' political ideas had a decisive influence on political developments and military reforms in the Dutch Republic has been challenged.

== Works ==
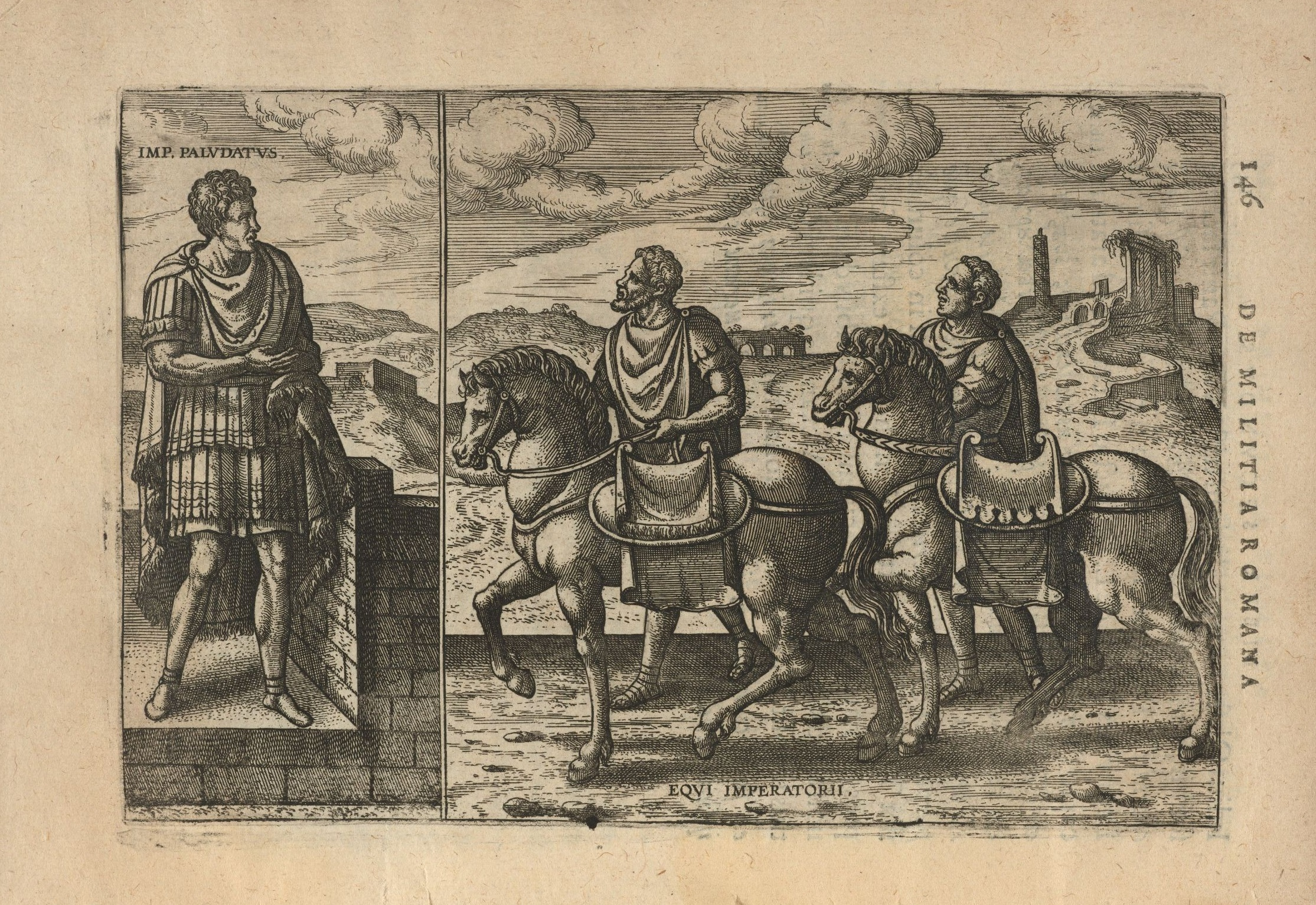
Illustration from De militia romana libri quinque, 1596

- Variarum Lectionum Libri Tres (1567)
- De Constantia Libri Duo, Qui alloquium praecipue continent in Publicis malis (Antwerp: Plantijn, 1584)
- Politicorum sive Civilis Doctrinae Libri Sex (Leiden: Plantijn-Raphelengius, 1589) Online version
- De militia romana (Antwerp: Plantijn-Moretus 1595)
- Admiranda, sive de Magnitudine Romana Libri Quattuor (Antwerp: Plantijn-Moretus, 1598) Online version
- De bibliothecis syntagma (Antwerp: Plantijn-Moretus, 1602)
- Manuductionis ad Stoicam Philosophiam Libri Tres, L. Annaeo Senecae, aliisque scriptoribus illustrandis (Antwerp: Plaintijn-Moretus, 1604)
- Diva Virgo Hallensis. Beneficia eius et miracula fide atque ordine descripta (Antwerp: Plantijn-Moretus, 1604)
- Annaei Senecae Philosophi Opera, Quae Exstant Omnia, A Iusto Lipsio emendata, et Scholiis illustrata (Antwerp: Plantijn-Moretus, 1605)
- Lovanium, sive Opidi et Academiae eius descriptio (Antwerp: Plantijn-Moretus, 1605)
- Monita et exempla politica (Admonitions), published in 1605

== See also ==
- Erycius Puteanus, his student
