= Countess Anna of Nassau =

Countess of Nassau (1563–1588)

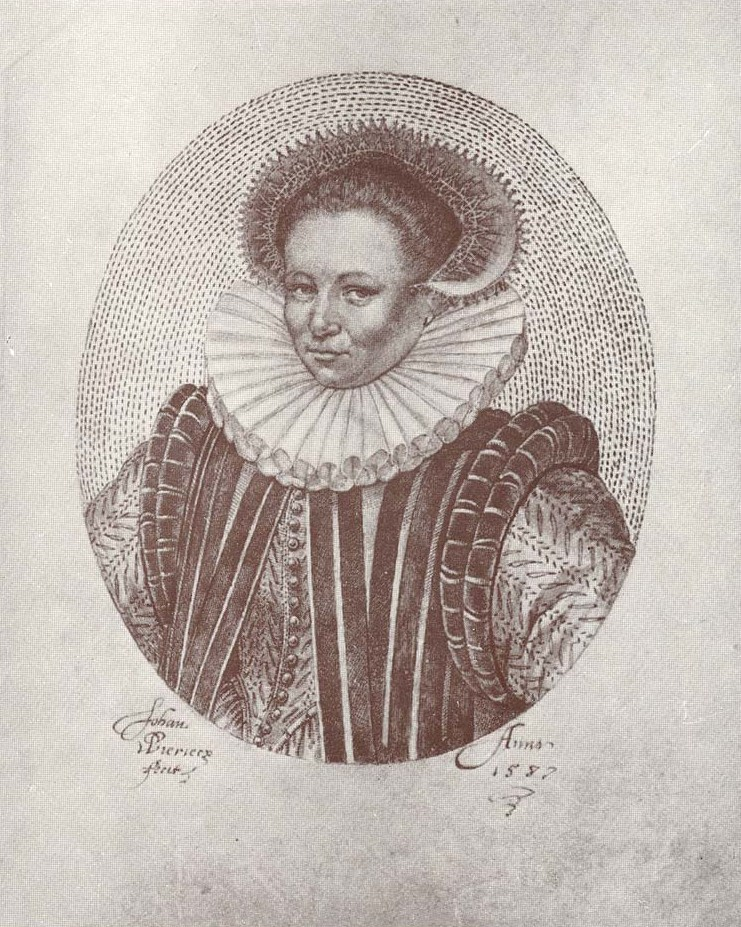
- Born: 5 November 1563; Breda
- Died: 23 June 1588 (aged 24); Franeker
- Noble family: Orange-Nassau
- Spouse: William Louis, Count of Nassau-Dillenburg
- Father: William the Silent
- Mother: Anna of Saxony

Countess Anna of Nassau (5 November 1563 – 23 June 1588) was the second daughter of William the Silent and his second wife, Anna of Saxony. She married William Louis, Count of Nassau-Dillenburg in 1587.

== Biography ==
Anna and William Louis were married just after Anna's twenty fourth birthday on November 25, 1587. The marriage was however only a short one, Anna died only six months after the marriage; therefore, they had no children and William Louis never remarried. William Louis became Count of Nassau-Dillenburg.

=== Family ===
Anna's mother, Anna of Saxony never had a happy marriage with Anna's father, William the Silent. Anna of Saxony was described as unstable and violent. She was unpopular with her family and the citizens.

Anna of Saxony took up with her lawyer, with whom she had an illegitimate daughter called Christina. After this incident, Anna and her siblings never saw their mother again. Anna of Saxony was sent to Beilstein castle with Christina, here her behavior became worse, until the servants were ordered to keep all knives away from her, lest she attack someone. Anna of Saxony began to suffer from hallucinations and violent outbursts. Christina was removed from her care and sent to be raised with her Anna and her siblings. William annulled their marriage, and remarried twice. Anna lived out the rest of her days in Dresden, until her death aged thirty-two in 1577.

Her father then married Charlotte of Bourbon, with whom he had six daughters. After her death in 1582, William married Louise de Coligny who gave birth to a son, Frederick Henry, Prince of Orange.

Among Anna's siblings were Maurice, Prince of Orange and Emilia of Nassau.

== Ancestry ==
Ancestors of Countess Anna of Nassau

8. John V, Count of Nassau-Siegen
4. William I, Count of Nassau-Siegen
9. Elisabeth of Hesse-Marburg
2. William the Silent
10. Bodo III, Count of Stolberg-Wernigerode
5. Juliana of Stolberg-Wernigerode
11. Anna of Eppstein-Königstein
1. Anna of Nassau
12. Henry IV, Duke of Saxony
6. Maurice, Elector of Saxony
13. Catherine of Mecklenburg
3. Anna of Saxony
14. Philip I, Landgrave of Hesse
7. Agnes of Hesse
15. Christine of Saxony
