= Philip Rubens =

Flemish antiquarian and philologist (1574–1611)

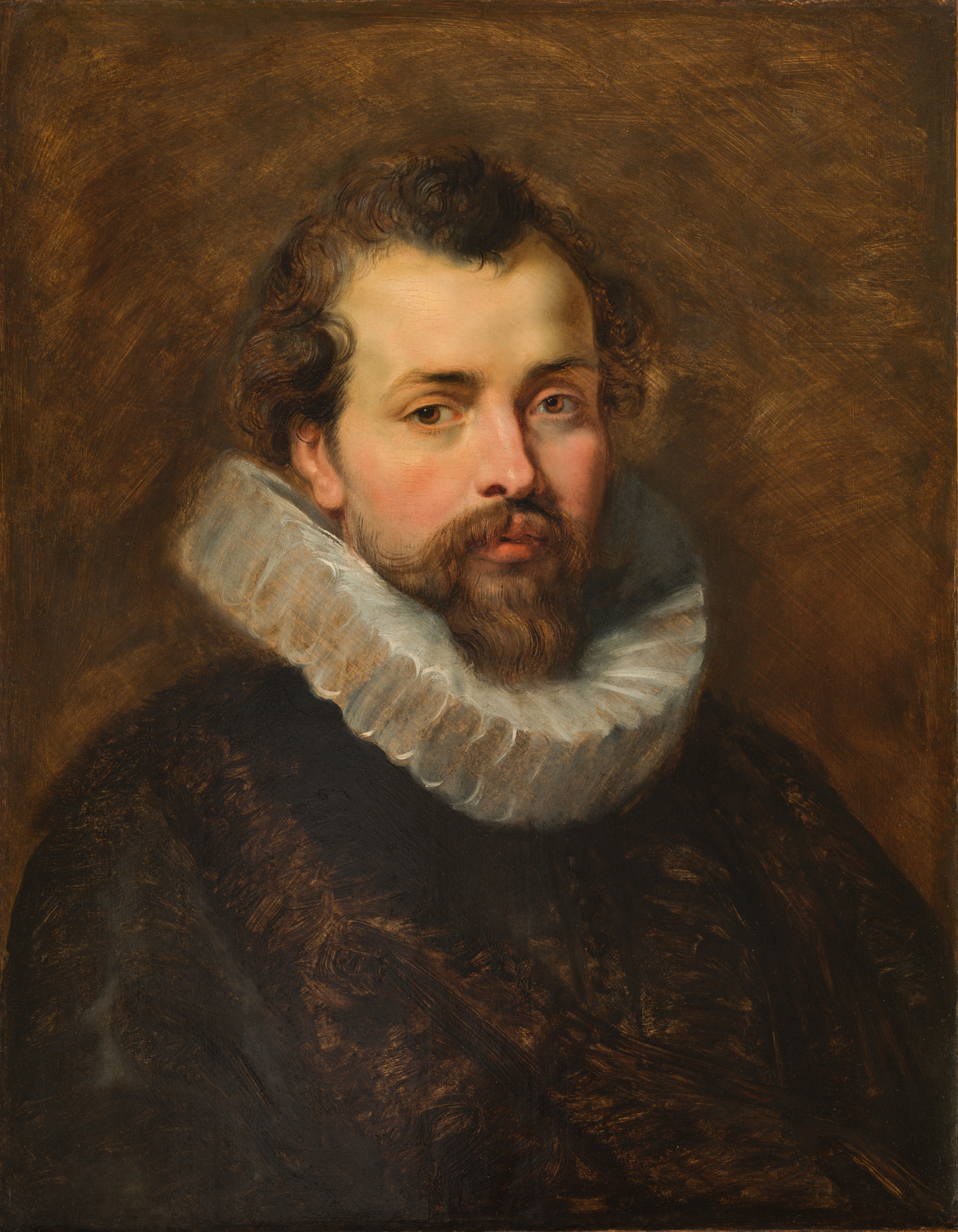
Portrait of Philip Rubens by his brother, 1610

Philip Rubens (/ˈruːbənz/; Dutch: [ˈrybəns]; 1574–1611), was a Flemish antiquarian, librarian, philologist and city administrator from the Spanish Netherlands. He was the older brother of the prominent Flemish Baroque painter Peter Paul Rubens.

== Life ==
Philip was born on 27 April 1574 in the city of Siegen to Jan Rubens and Maria Pypelincks. His parents had fled with their families from Antwerp in the Habsburg Netherlands to Cologne in 1568 because they feared persecution as Calvinists in their homeland. His father Jan Rubens was a lawyer and had been an alderman in Antwerp from 1562 to 1568. His mother Maria Pypelinckx came from a prominent family originally from Kuringen, near Hasselt.

The nobility in the Southern Netherlands at the time sided with the Reformation and Jan Rubens also converted to Calvinism. In 1566 the Iconoclasm raged, which was followed by a period of severe repression by the Catholic Spanish king Phillip II. In 1568, the Rubens family, with two boys and two girls, fled to Cologne because, as Calvinists, they feared persecution in their homeland during the harsh rule of the Duke of Alba, the Governor of the Habsburg Netherlands.

After Philip's father was appointed legal advisor to Anna of Saxony, the second wife of William the Silent, the Rubens family moved in 1570 to Siegen where her court was located. Jan Rubens then had an affair with Anna of Saxony which led to a pregnancy. Jan Rubens was incarcerated for the affair and was at risk of being sentenced to death. Thanks to his wife's entreaties, his life was spared and was released from prison after two years. After his release, Jan Rubens was banned from practicing as a lawyer for a while. This put heavy pressure on the family, which was only relieved when the professional ban was given up after the death of Anna of Saxony in 1577. In this difficult situation, Philip was born in 1574, followed in 1577 by his brother Peter Paul. In 1578 the Rubens family moved to Cologne where father Jan Rubens died in 1587. The widow Maria Pypelinckx returned with her family to Antwerp in 1590, where she again converted to Catholicism.

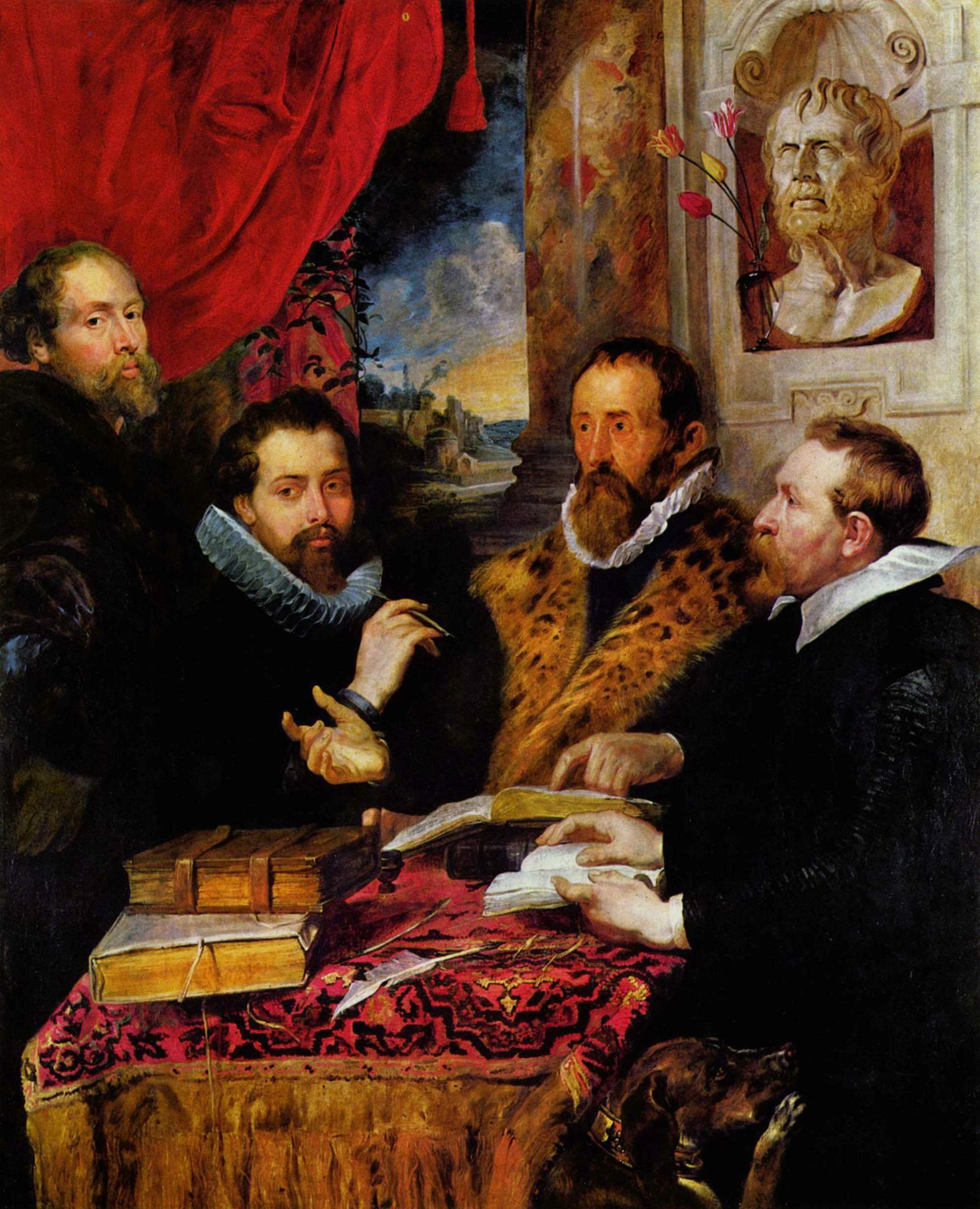
The Four Philosophers (Philip Rubens 2nd from left)

Philip Rubens attended with his younger brother Peter Paul in Antwerp the Latin school of Rombout Verdonck, where they studied Latin classics. In 1590 the brothers had to stop their education for financial reasons, more specifically to provide a dowry for their sister Baldina. Philip had distinguished himself in his studies. He succeeded in obtaining an appointment as secretary to Jean Richardot, president of the Secret Council, in Brussels. At the same time, he became the private teacher of Richardot's sons Guillaume and Antoine. Philip accompanied the sons to Leuven when they became students at the Leuven University. They lived there with Justus Lipsius and attended his lectures. Philip became one of the professor's favourite students. After a four-year stay in Leuven, Philip returned to Jean Richardot in Brussels in 1599.

When Guillaume Richardot travelled to Italy in 1601, Philip accompanied him and continued his law studies in Rome. Here he obtained the degree doctor of both laws in Rome. He returned to the Low Countries in 1604, and was offered a position at the university, but chose to travel to Italy again, where he was also offered a position at the University of Bologna. Turning his back on an academic career, he became librarian and secretary to Cardinal Ascanio Colonna in Rome. His brother Peter Paul was also at the time of his second residence in Rome. The brothers lived together on Via della Croce near Piazza di Spagna. They had thus the opportunity to share their common interest in Classical art.

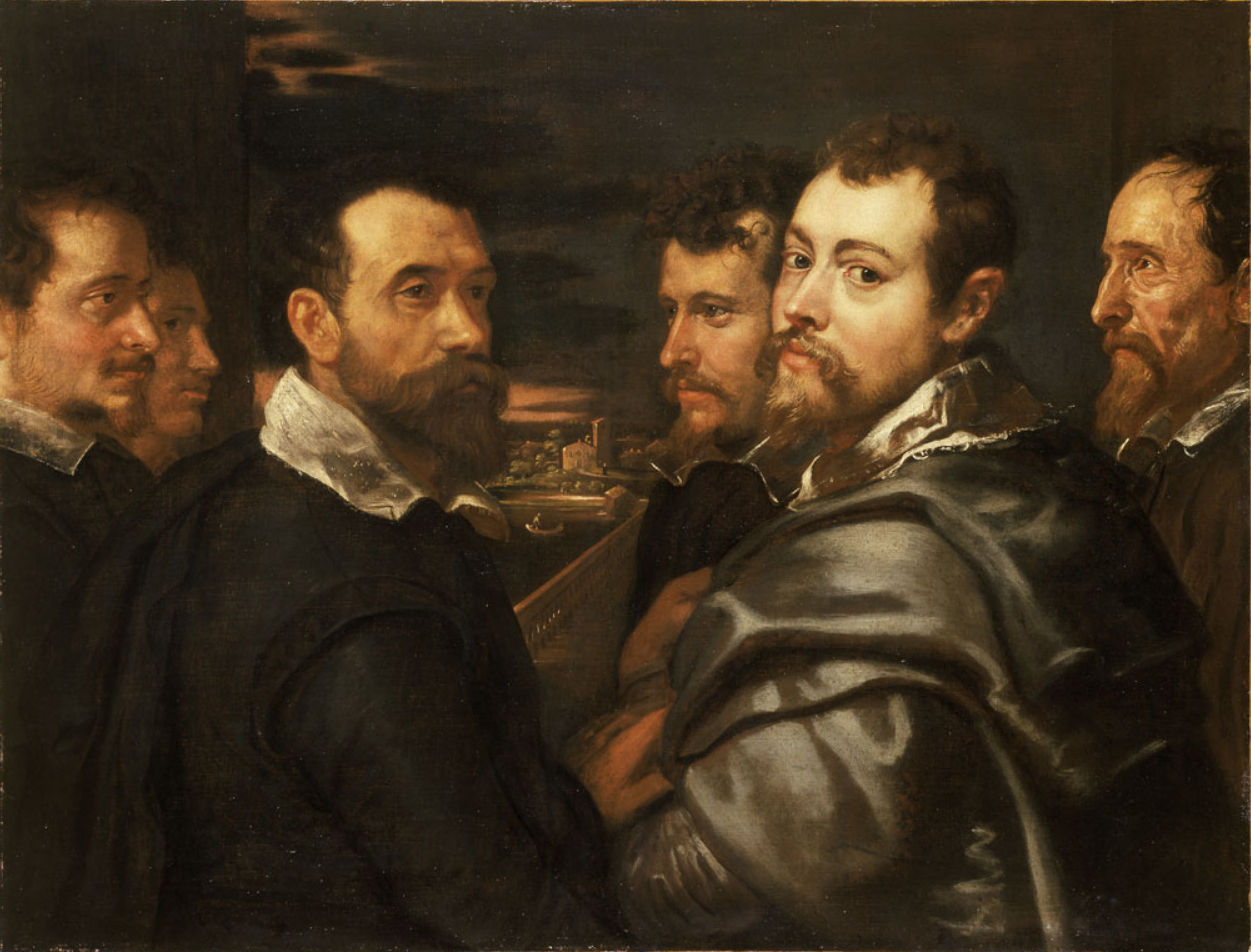
Self-Portrait in a Circle of Friends from Mantua, 1602-06

Philip again returned to Antwerp in November 1606. In January 1609 he was appointed secretary to the city of Antwerp. The following March, he married Maria de Moy, whose father Hendrik de Moy had also been secretary to the city, and whose sister, Clara, was the step-mother of Isabella Brant, who later became Peter Paul Rubens's first wife. Philip and Maria had two children: Clara II Rubens (1610) and Philip II Rubens (1611).

Philip died on 28 August 1611 in Antwerp, one year after his father-in-law Hendrik de Moy. He was buried in St. Michael's Abbey, Antwerp. A memorial volume was issued containing the posthumous publication of his edition of the homilies of Asterius of Amasea, together with a short biography of Philip, a selection of Latin poems that he had written, and Latin poems written in his memory by his friends.

His brother Peter Paul painted two group portraits with Philip one including himself, Justus Lipsius, and Joannes Woverius and another one with Philip behind Peter Paul, and also featuring Galilei, Justus Lipsius, Guillaume Richardot on the far left with either Nicolaas Rockox or Juan Batiste Perez de Baron behind him.

== Works ==
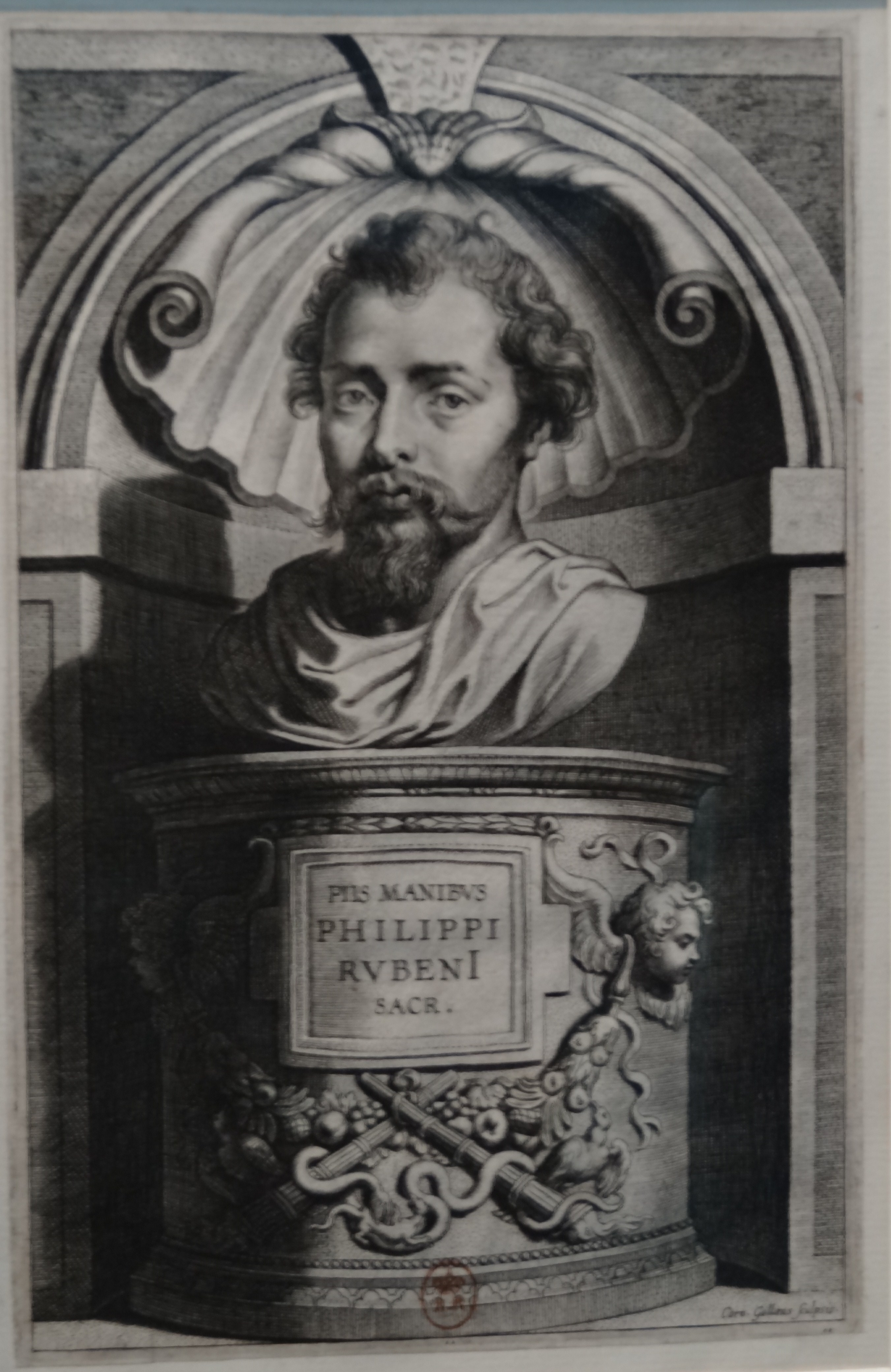
Portrait of Philip Rubens engraved by Cornelis Galle the Elder after design by Rubens

Philip was the author of two works. The first work with the title Electorum libri II. In quibus antiqui ritus, emendationes, censurae. Eiusdem ad Iustum Lipsium Poëmatia was published in Antwerp in 1608. The book, written in Latin, contains studies on various aspects of Roman antiquities and customs and Rubens' proposals for solving doubtful passages in various Latin works. The book ends with five poems dedicated to the then recently deceased Justus Lipsius, a eulogy to Justus Lipsius and a poem dedicated to his brother Peter Paul Rubens. The book contains five prints engraved by the famous engraver Cornelis Galle after drawings by his brother Peter Paul. The prints illustrate certain customs of the ancient Romans such as the way in which they draped their toga and their wives wore the double tunic. A sixth print is a copy of a print from another book about the Roman toga, entitled Hieronymi Bossii De toga romana commentarius.

The Dutch classicist Hendrik Snakenburg quoted in his edition of the Roman historian Quintus Curtius Rufus' De rebus gestis Alexandri Magni (Delft and Leiden, 1724) the three chapters of the Electorum libri II in which Philip Rubens had corrected the surviving text of Rufus.

The second work by Philip Rubens is entitled S.Asterii, episcopi Amaseae, Homiliae Graece et Latine nunc primum editae and was published posthumously in Antwerp in 1615. The book contains the original Greek text and Philip's Latin translation of five sermons by Saint Asterius of Amasya, the manuscripts of which Philip had discovered in the library of Cardinal Colonna. The second part of the book begins with a selection of poems, letters and other occasional writings written by Philip Rubens in honor of friends, patrons and scholars. This is followed by a number of texts about Philip Rubens on the occasion of his death. This section contains a portrait of the deceased engraved by Cornelis Galle after a drawing by Peter Paul Rubens and is introduced by a biography of Philip written by Jan Brant, brother-in-law of Philip and father-in-law of Peter Paul.

== Publications ==
- Electorum libri II (Antwerp, 1608) Available on Google Books.
- S. Asterii Episcopi Amaseæ Homiliæ Græce & Latine (Antwerp, 1615) Available on Google Books.}
