= Maria Pypelinckx =

Mother of Peter Paul Rubens

- Born: 20 March 1538 Kuringen
- Died: 19 October 1608 (aged 70) Antwerp
- Spouse: Jan Rubens (m. 1561; died 1587)
- Children: Philip Rubens; Peter Paul Rubens

Maria Pypelinckx (20 March 1538 – 19 October 1608) was a writer from modern-day Belgium, best known today as the mother of the painter Peter Paul Rubens.

== Early life ==
Pypelinckx was born in Kuringen, now a part of Hasselt, as the daughter of Hendrik Pypelinckx and Clara Touion.

Little is known of her early life, but she married a lawyer, Jan Rubens, in 1561 in Antwerp who had just resettled there in 1558 after a long trip to Italy. They lived in a house on the Meir. Rubens was a magistrate in Antwerp during the period of upheaval, and survived the beeldenstorm. He became known for his Calvinist sympathies and the family was forced to flee in 1568, possibly to avoid working for the Council of Troubles. Maria had already borne four children by 1567 but it is unknown how many children accompanied them on their flight. They settled in Cologne, but always intended to return to Antwerp once the troubles settled.

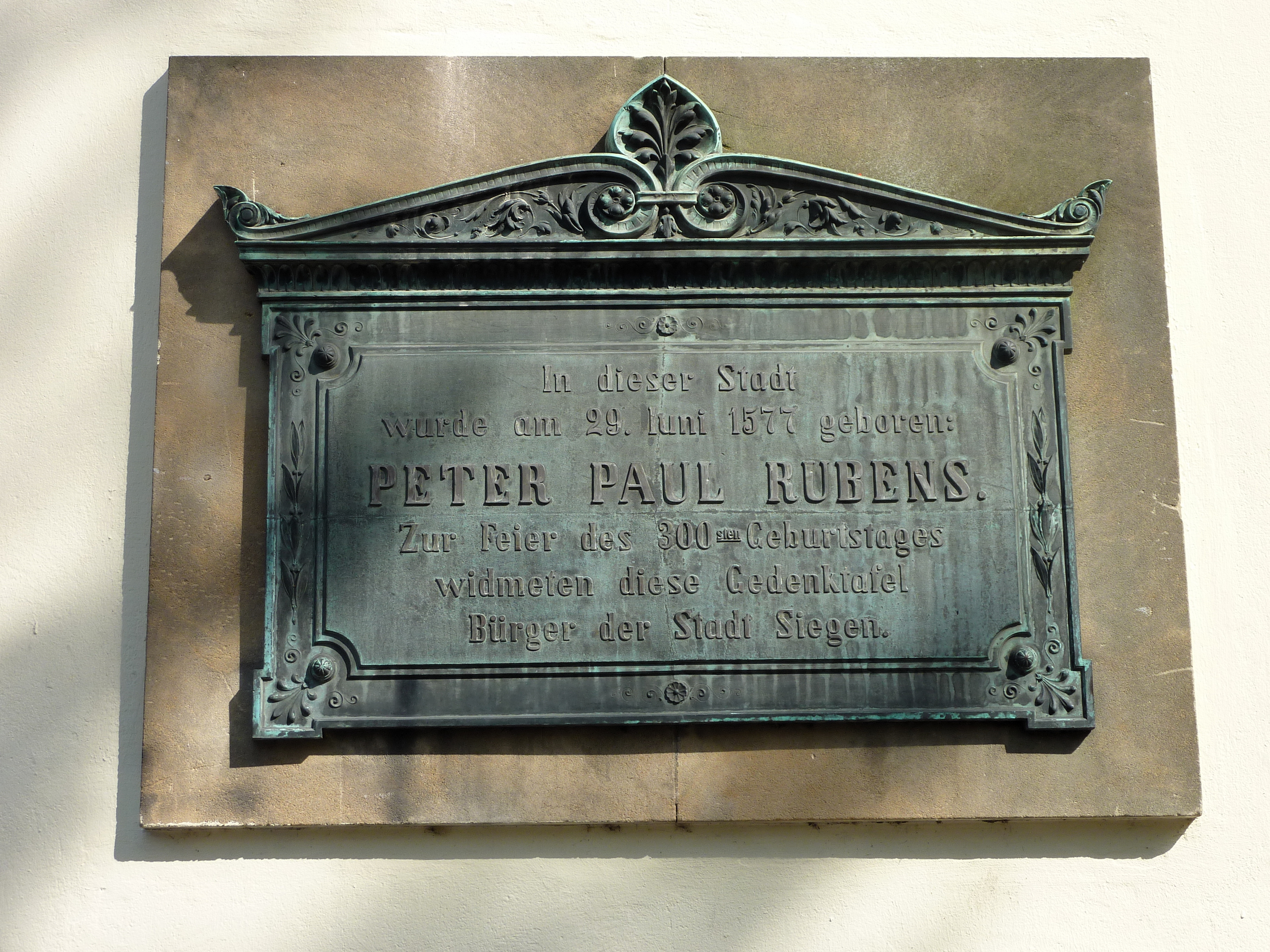
1877 plaque in Siegen commemorating the birth of Rubens three centuries before

== Refugees ==
Rubens found work as a lawyer among the many refugees in that city and was approached by Anna of Saxony to help her recover some of her bridal dowry, which her husband's family had invested in their war on the Duke of Alva. Anna and Rubens both had vested interests in the Southern Netherlands that they were attempting to salvage and perhaps they were living in close proximity. They had an affair which resulted in pregnancy. In March 1571, Rubens was arrested by members of the Nassau family and taken to Dillenburg. On 22 August 1571, Anna of Saxony gave birth to their daughter, Christine von Dietz in Siegen. Maria promptly moved to Siegen (about 35 kilometers from Dillenburg) and began to write letters of support to her husband, who thought at the time he might be put to death. She also wrote to various members of the Nassau family, including Anna's brother-in-law Johann VI, Count of Nassau-Dillenburg.

Rubens was allowed to join his family in Siegen on condition of payment of 6,000 daalders bail, but he was not allowed out of Siegen or do any business work until the death of Anna of Saxony in Dresden on 18 December 1577.

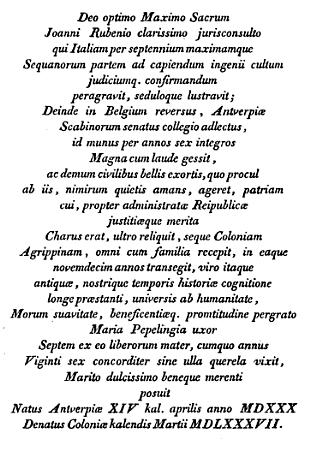
Latin Epitaph for her husband, written in Latin by Maria complimenting him as a husband, but with the poignant remark that she bore seven children "all by him".

== Family ==
Maria Pypelinckx remained true to her husband and continued to bear him children, most notably Philip on 27 April 1574 and Peter Paul on 28 June 1577. By 1575, it was clear that, although they were not divorced, William the Silent planned to neglect his wife. He married Charlotte of Bourbon on 24 June 1575. He had managed to get five professors of the new University of Leiden to annul his marriage to Anna of Saxony who was then sent in secret to Dresden where she was locked up in a windowless room. After her death, Maria wrote to William and they were granted permission to move to Cologne. In 1583, they were asked to leave Cologne due to Calvinist sympathies, but again through letters, Maria was able to gain permission to stay.

By that time she had taken on boarders to help in the finances and her husband was able to do business as a lawyer again. On 1 March 1587, her husband Jan Rubens was buried in Cologne. She had a gravestone installed in which she complimented his qualities as a scholar and a husband, mentioning 25 years of marriage without arguments. She returned to Antwerp the same year. She took a house in the Kloosterstraat and sent young Peter Paul to work as a page for Margaretha de Ligne-Arenberg, widow of Philip de Lalaing (1537–82). He then announced he wanted to become a painter, and with support from her family, Maria sent him as an apprentice to Tobias Verhaecht, a distant relative. In 1600, Peter Paul left on a trip to Italy and his older brother Philip, a lawyer like his father had been, moved in with her.

== Death ==
Pypelinckx died in Antwerp on 19 October 1608 after becoming ill. Rubens received news of her illness and rushed home but arrived too late. He never returned to Italy.

== Sources ==
- Review of Het huwelijk van Willemvan Oranje met anna van Saxen, historisch-kritisch onderzocht door R.C. Bakhuizen van den Brink.Te Amsterdam, bij Johannes Muller. 1853. in the Digital Library for Dutch Literature, which mentions the letters of Maria Pypelinckx regarding her husband, the father of Peter Paul Rubens
