= NIS code =

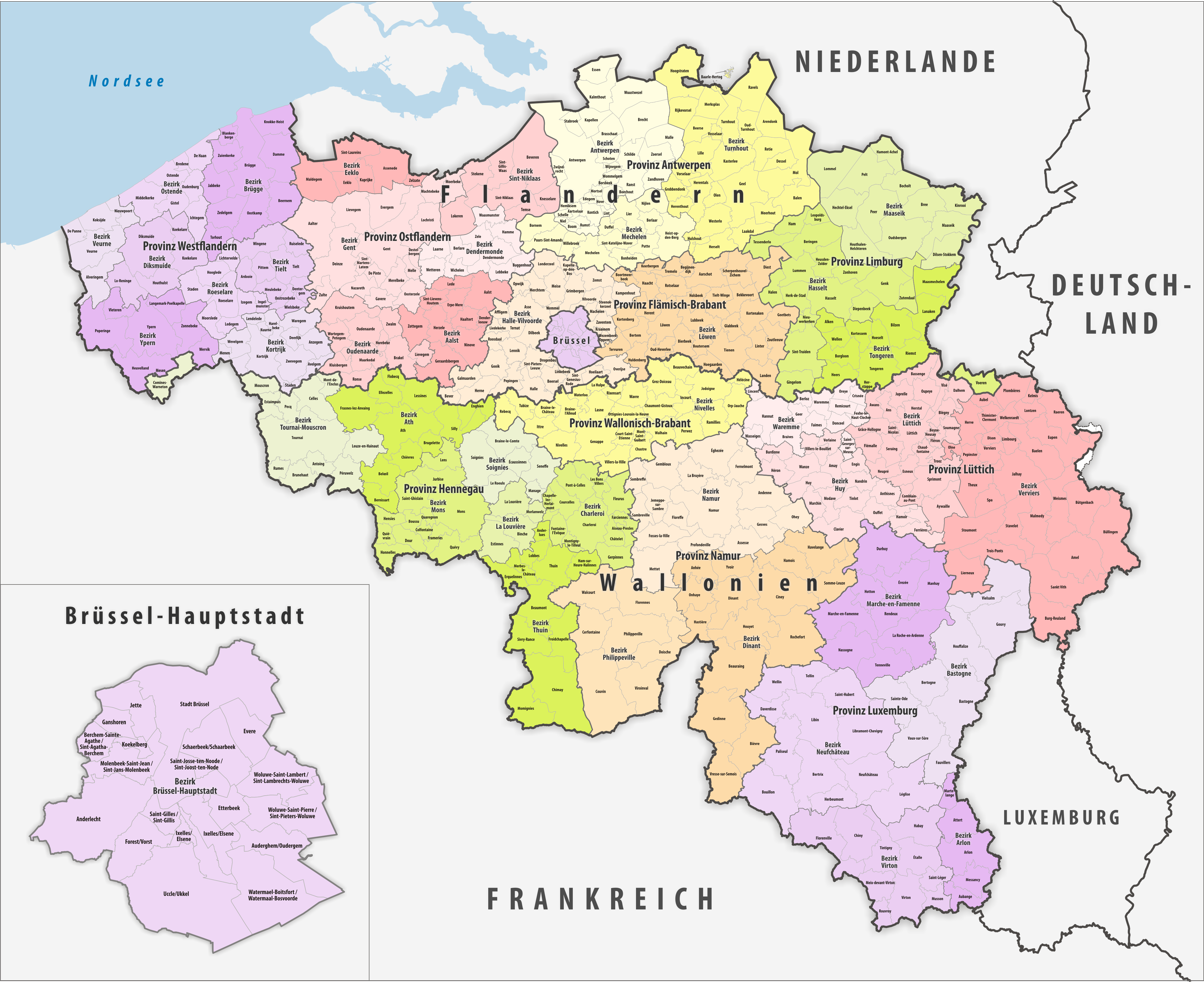
areas of Belgium

The NIS code (Dutch: NIS-code, French: code INS) is a numeric code for regional areas of Belgium.

This code is used for statistical data treatment in Belgium. This code was developed mid-1960s by the Statistics Belgium. It was first used for the census of 1970.

== Structure of the code ==
The NIS code consists of 5 digits:

- The first number identifies the province. if this digit is followed by 4 zeroes, this code identifies the complete province. Example: 70000 identifies the province Limburg.
- The second digit identifies the arrondissement within this province. If after the two first digits there are three zeroes, then this code identifies the complete arrondissement. Example: 71000 identifies the arrondissement of Hasselt.
- The last three digits uniquely identify the municipality within that arrondissement. Example: 71066 identifies Zonhoven.

== Special cases ==
- The country Belgium received the code 01000.
- The three regions received the codes 02000 for Flanders, 03000 for Wallonia and 04000 for the Brussels region.
- In 1995 the province of Brabant with first digit 2 was split in Flemish Brabant and Walloon Brabant. Flemish Brabant received code 20001 and Walloon Brabant received code 20002. The arrondissements kept their old codes.
- The provinces and municipalities of Brussels are sorted alphabetically on their French name.

== Mergers ==
- municipalities that were merged and received a new name also received a new NIS code, which followed the last number of the list of municipalities of that arrondissement.
- municipalities that lost their independence by merger and became municipality parts, also lost their NIS code. Per merged municipality only 1 NIS code remained. At the same time the structure of the NIS sector was adapted. An alphabetic letter was added per municipality part to be able to uniquely identify such a municipality part.
- The Arrondissement of Brussels-Periphery with code 22000 merging in 1971 with the arrondissement of Halle-Vilvoorde, also lost its code by merger. The municipalities within this arrondissement received a new NIS code.

== Examples ==
40000: Province East Flanders

- 4 Province East Flanders
- 0000 This code identifies the complete province

32000: Arrondissement of Diksmuide

- 3 Province West Flanders
- 2 Arrondissement of Diksmuide
- 000 This code identifies the complete arrondissement

73032: municipality Hoeselt

- 7 Province Limburg
- 3 Arrondissement of Tongeren
- 032 municipality Hoeselt

61012: municipality Clavier

- 6 Province Liège
- 1 Arrondissement of Huy
- 012 municipality Clavier

23105: municipality Affligem

- 23 Arrondissement of Halle-Vilvoorde
- 105 municipality Affligem (new name of this municipality, resulting in the number no longer corresponding with the alphabetic order)

71022E: municipality part Stokrooie

- 7 Province Limburg
- 1 Arrondissement of Hasselt
- 022 Merged municipality Hasselt
- E municipality part Stokrooie, which had the code 71056 before the merger.
