= Jan Rubens =

Flemish lawyer and administrator of Antwerp (1530–1587)

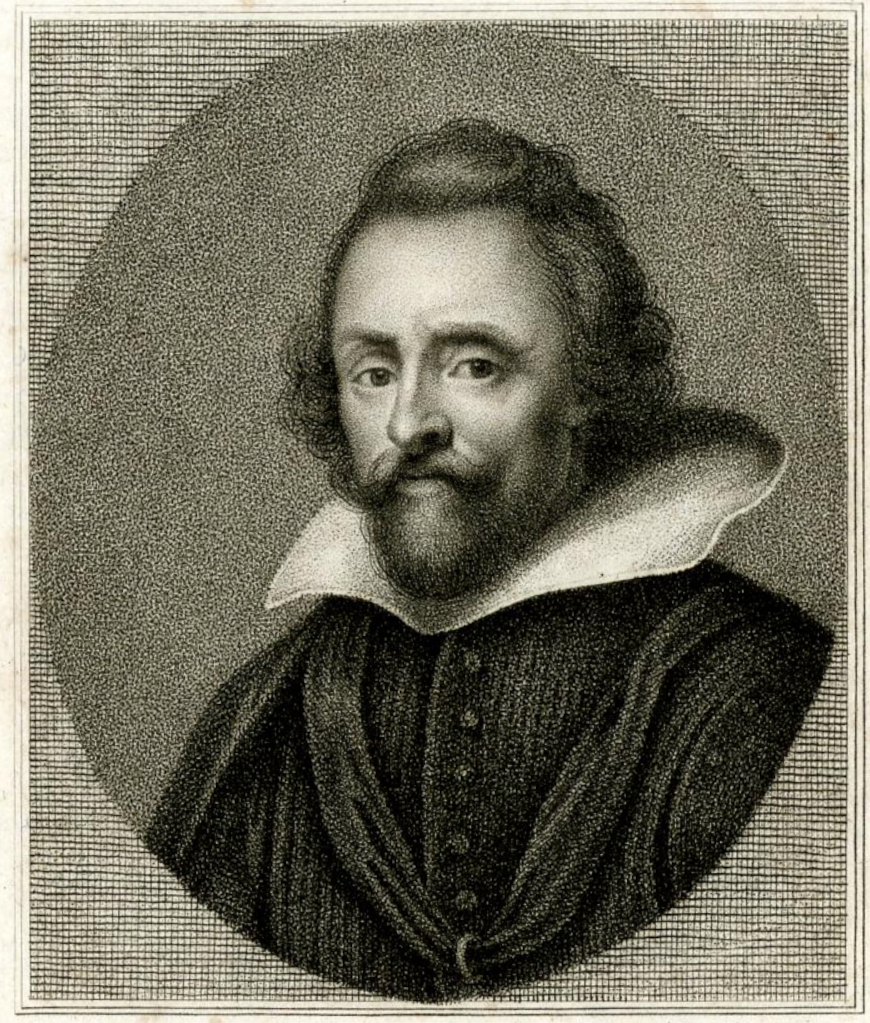
- Born: March/April 1530; Antwerp, Spanish Netherlands
- Died: 1 March 1587 (aged 56); Free Imperial City of Cologne, Holy Roman Empire
- Spouse: Maria Pypelinckx (m. 1558)
- Children: Philip Rubens; Peter Paul Rubens

Jan Rubens (/ˈruːbənz/; Dutch: [ˈrybəns]; 1530–1587) was a Flemish lawyer and city administrator of Antwerp, then located in the Spanish Netherlands. A convert to Calvinism, he fled Antwerp with his family because of the suppression of Protestantism in the Spanish Netherlands and settled in Cologne. He was imprisoned in 1571 because of an affair with his client Anna of Saxony, the second wife of William I of Orange, the leader of the Protestant resistance against the Spanish king who ruled the Spanish Netherlands. He was later released but required to remain in Siegen. He returned to Cologne with his family only in 1578. Rubens is considered to be the natural father of Christine von Diez, the daughter of Anna of Saxony, who was born in Siegen in 1571.

He is best known as the father of the famous painter Peter Paul Rubens, who was born in Siegen in 1577.

== Family ==
Rubens was born in Antwerp as the son of Bartholomaeus I Rubens and Barbara Arents (called Spierinck). The Rubens family were long-time residents of Antwerp tracing their lineage there back to 1350. Records show that a certain Arnold Rubens bought 'a house with court' in the Gasthuisstraat in Antwerp in 1396. The Rubens family belonged to the well-to-do bourgeois class and its members were known to operate grocery shops and pharmacies. Jan Rubens decided to study law and lived from 1556 to 1562 in the main cities of Italy to further his studies. He was awarded the degree of doctor of ecclesiastical and civil law by the Sapienza University in Rome. Upon his return to Antwerp in 1557 he became a lawyer. He married in 1558 Maria Pypelinckx, who came from a prominent family originally from Kuringen, near Hasselt. On 7 May 1562 he was appointed to the office of alderman of Antwerp and served in this position until 1568.

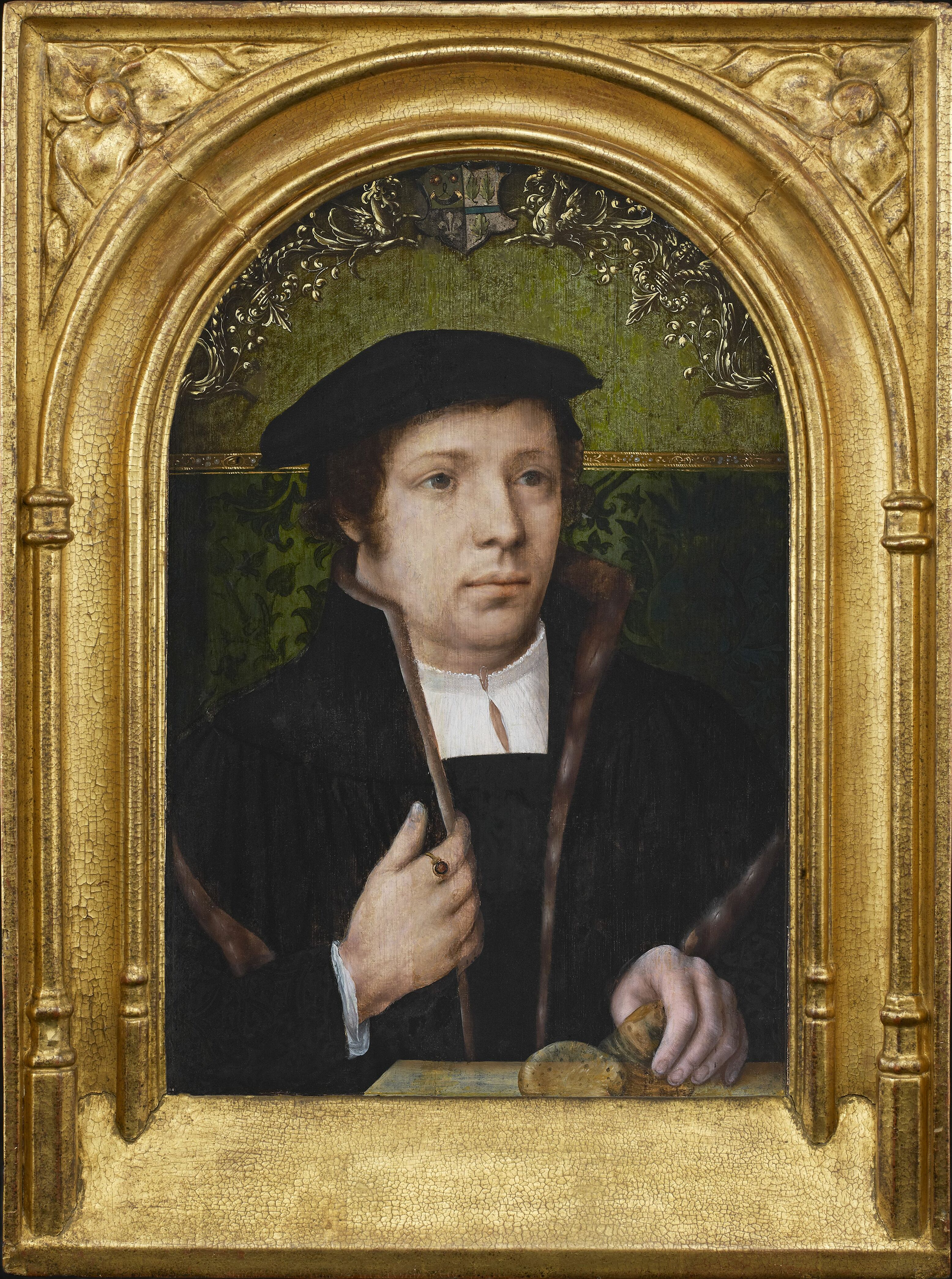
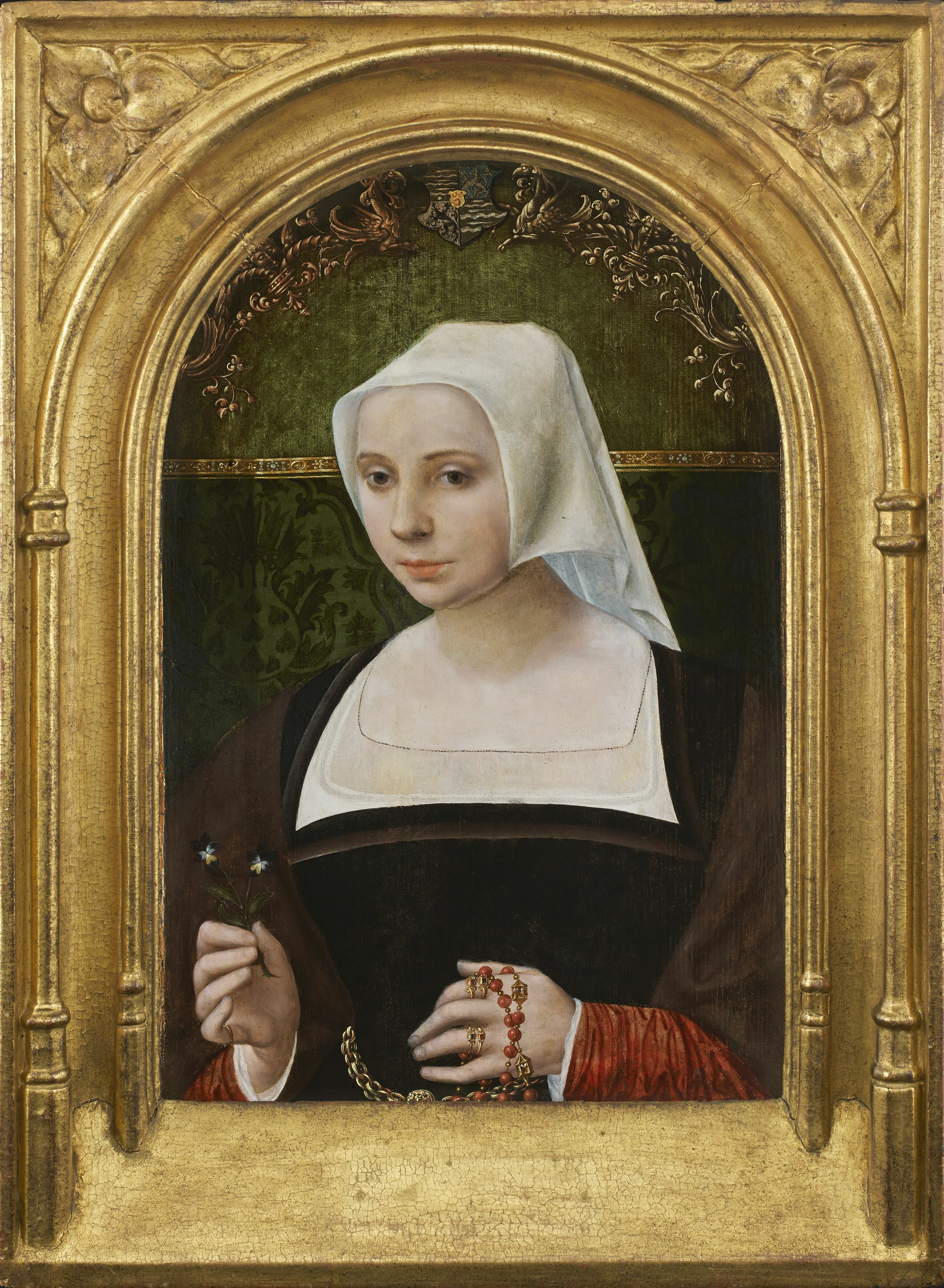
Portraits of Jan Rubens's parents by Jacob van Utrecht (1530)

A large portion of the nobility and bourgeoisie in the Southern Netherlands at the time sided with the Reformation. Jan Rubens also converted to Calvinism. In 1566 the Low Countries were the victim of the iconoclasic fury, referred to in Dutch as the Beeldenstorm during which Catholic art and many forms of church fittings and decorations were destroyed in mob actions by Calvinist Protestant crowds. The ruler of the Spanish Netherlands—the Catholic Spanish king Philip II—reacted to the unrest by ordering the severe repression of the followers of the Reformation. In 1568, the Rubens family, with two boys and two girls (Jan Baptist (1562–1600), Blandina (1564–1606), Clara (1565–1580) and Hendrik (1567–1583)), fled to Cologne. As Calvinists, they feared persecution in their homeland during the harsh rule of the Duke of Alba, who as the Governor of the Spanish Netherlands was responsible for implementing the harsh repression.

In Cologne he could renew his work as a lawyer, because there were many Flemish and Dutch refugees there who wanted to recover seized property they had left behind. He became in 1570 the legal adviser of Anna of Saxony, the second wife of William I of Orange. At the time Anna of Saxony lived in Cologne. She later moved to Siegen about 90 kilometres from Cologne. Jan Rubens would visit her there while his family remained in Cologne. They had an affair which resulted in pregnancy. When it was discovered, Rubens was arrested during a trip he took to Siegen to visit her and he was locked up in the Nassau family's castle at Dillenburg in March 1571. His wife, who knew nothing of the affair, came to support him after he wrote to tell her he feared he would be executed. She supported him throughout his imprisonment. Thanks to her letters, Rubens was allowed to join his family in Siegen on condition of payment of 6,000 daalders bail, but he was not permitted to leave Siegen or do any work. This caused the rest of the family, who had joined Jan in Siegen, to experience financial difficulties. His illegitimate daughter with Anna of Saxony, Christine von Diez, was born on 22 August 1571. In 1574 Jan and Maria Pypelinckx had a son called Philip. He would become an antiquarian, librarian, philologist and city administrator in Antwerp but died at a young age. In 1577 Peter Paul Rubens was born.

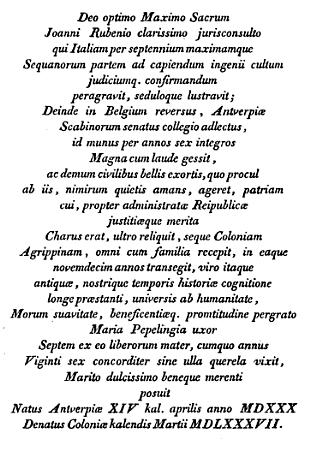
Latin Epitaph for Jan Rubens, written by his wife complimenting him as a husband.

Anna of Saxony died in 1577. The travel ban imposed on Jan Rubens was lifted in 1578 on condition that he not settle in the Prince of Orange's possessions nor in the hereditary dominions of the Low Countries and maintain the bail bond of 6,000 thalers as security. He was allowed to leave his place of exile in Siegen and to move the Rubens family to Cologne. While in Siegen, the family had of necessity belonged to the Lutheran Church. In Cologne, the family reconverted to Catholicism.

The eldest son, Jan Baptist, who may also have been an artist, left for Italy in 1586. Jan Rubens died in 1587 and was buried in Cologne's St. Peter's Church, a Catholic church. His widow Maria Pypelinckx returned with the rest of the family (i.e. Blandina, Philip and Peter Paul) to Antwerp in 1590, where they moved into a house on the Kloosterstraat. In 1597 Christine Von Dietz was married to Viscount Johann Wilhelm von Welschenengst-Bernkott. The couple had three children. During the Thirty Years' War, their property was confiscated and after her husband died in 1636, Christina had to seek shelter with relatives. She probably moved in with her daughter Katharina. After her death, Christina was buried in the cathedral of Meissen.

== Sources ==
- Femke Deen: Anna van Saksen. Verstoten bruid van Willem van Oranje. Atlas Contact, Amsterdam 2018. ISBN 978-9045024721.
- Ingrun Mann: Anna of Saxony. The Scarlet Lady of Orange. Winged Hussar Publishing, Point Pleasant, New Jersey 2016. ISBN 978-0996365727.
- Rosine De Dijn: Liebe, Last und Leidenschaft. Frauen im Leben von Rubens. DVA, Stuttgart und München 2002. (Covers both Jan and Peter Paul Rubens.)
- Hans-Joachim Böttcher: Anna Prinzessin von Sachsen 1544–1577 – Eine Lebenstragödie, Dresden 2013, ISBN 978-3-941757-39-4.
