= Hendrik de Moy =

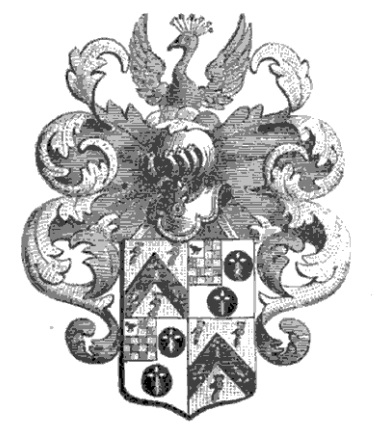
Coat of arms of the de Moy family

Hendrik de Moy (Herentals, 21 April 1534 – 15 February 1610, Antwerp) was secretary of the Antwerp city council and a historian.

== Family ==
He was born the son of Nicolaes de Moy, secretary of Herentals, and Catharina Monincx. In 1596, he married Clara of Gülick, daughter of Melchior, in the church of Saint Walburga. They became the parents of Clara de Moy, who married Jan Brandt, clerk of the Antwerp city council, and whose daughter Isabella Brant married Peter Paul Rubens. Hendrik's other daughter, Maria de Moy, married Philip Rubens. Several of his descendants followed him in service of the city of Antwerp and became clerks of the city council.

=== Descendants ===
Henri de Moy: Secretary of Antwerp
Married to Clara of Gülick

  - Clara de Moy;
    married Jan Brandt, clerk of Antwerp city council.
    - Isabella Brant (1591-1626);
      married Peter Paul Rubens
      - Nicolaas Rubens, Lord of Rameyen (1618-1655)
        - Albert Maria Rubens, Lord of Rameyen (1642-1672): alderman of Antwerp.
      - Albert Rubens; secretary of the Privy Council of the Habsburg Netherlands.
  - Maria de Moy,
    married Philip Rubens (1574–1611): secretary to Cardinal Ascanio Colonna.
    - Philip II Rubens (1611-1678): Secretary of Antwerp.

== Career ==
Before he settled in Antwerp, he completed his studies as a doctor of both laws. He was appointed by Nicolaas II Rockox and Lancelot II of Ursel, Mayors of Antwerp. During his career, over a 25-year period, he successfully reassembled the archive dispersed after the fire in the city hall in 1576. He inventorised and organised the old archive. His works are of great importance for the history of the city, among them an important work describing the Joyous Entry of the archdukes.

De Moy was buried inside the cathedral and a street in Antwerp was named after him.

Political offices
Preceded by	Secretary of Antwerp; 1563–1609	Succeeded by
