= Agnes of Hesse =

Hessian princess and Saxon consort

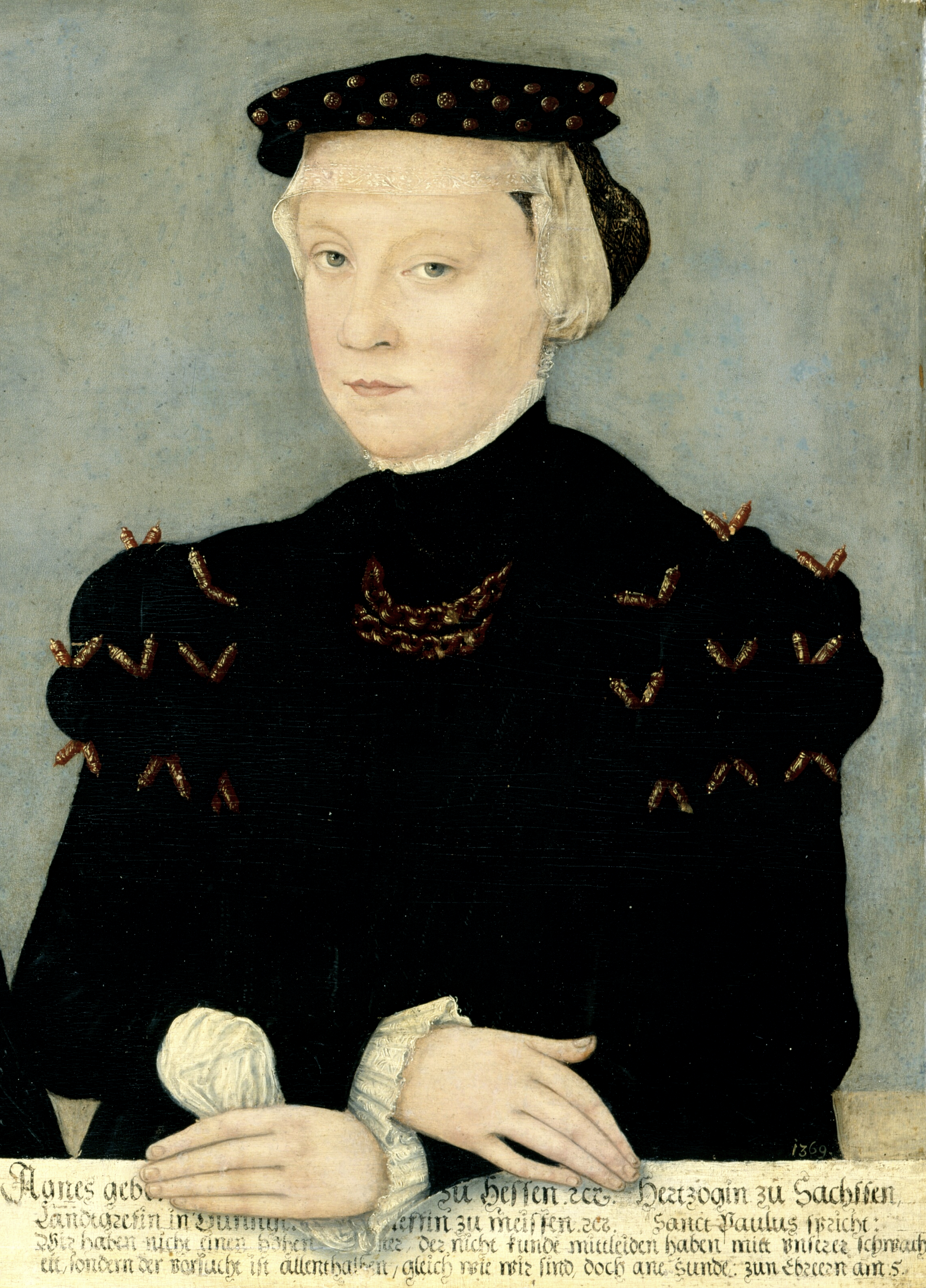
- 1559 portrait

Electress consort of Saxony
- Tenure: 24 April 1547 – 9 July 1553

Duchess consort of Saxony
- Tenure: 18 August 1541 – 24 April 1547
- Tenure: 25 May – 4 November 1555
- Born: 31 May 1527; Marburg
- Died: 4 November 1555 (aged 28); Weimar
- Spouse: Maurice, Elector of Saxony (m. 1541; died 1553) John Frederick II, Duke of Saxony (m. 1555)
- Issue: Anna, Princess of Orange; Prince Albert
- House: Hesse
- Father: Philip I, Landgrave of Hesse
- Mother: Christine of Saxony

Agnes of Hesse (31 May 1527 – 4 November 1555) was a princess of Hesse by birth and by marriage Electress of Saxony.

== Life ==
Agnes was a daughter of Philip I, Landgrave of Hesse, and his first wife, Christine of Saxony. She married Maurice, Duke (and later Elector) of Saxony, on 9 January 1541. From this marriage, she had two children: Anna of Saxony and Albert. The marriage between the two was not arranged by their parents but was initiated by Maurice and Agnes themselves, which at the time was highly unusual. Their surviving letters document the continuing friendship and mutual trust between the spouses. Agnes was also informed about the political plans of her husband. After her mother Christine's death in 1549, she took on the education of her younger siblings. Elector Maurice died on 9 July 1553 from his injuries in the Battle of Sievershausen.

On 26 May 1555, Agnes married her second husband, John Frederick II, Duke of Saxony. She was already of poor health at the time, and died six months later from a miscarriage. In the choir of the church St. Peter und Paul in Weimar, however, an unknown author states her death was due to poisoning. The fact that Agnes of Hesse had married into a rival family is consistent with the murder theory: members of the Albertine branch of the House of Wettin may have suspected her of revealing state secrets to the rival Ernestine branch.

== Footnotes ==
Agnes of Hesse House of Hesse Born: 31 May 1527 Died: 4 November 1555
German royalty
Preceded by Catherine of Mecklenburg	Duchess consort of Saxony (Albertine); 18 August 1541 – 24 April 1547	Succeeded by Sybille of Cleves
Preceded by Sybille of Cleves	Electress consort of Saxony; 24 April 1547 – 9 July 1553	Succeeded by Anne of Denmark
Preceded by Catherine of Mecklenburg	Duchess consort of Saxony (Ernestine); 26 May 1555 – 4 November 1555	Vacant Title next held by Elisabeth of the Palatinate
