= Maurice, Elector of Saxony =

Elector of Saxony from 1547 to 1553

Maurice
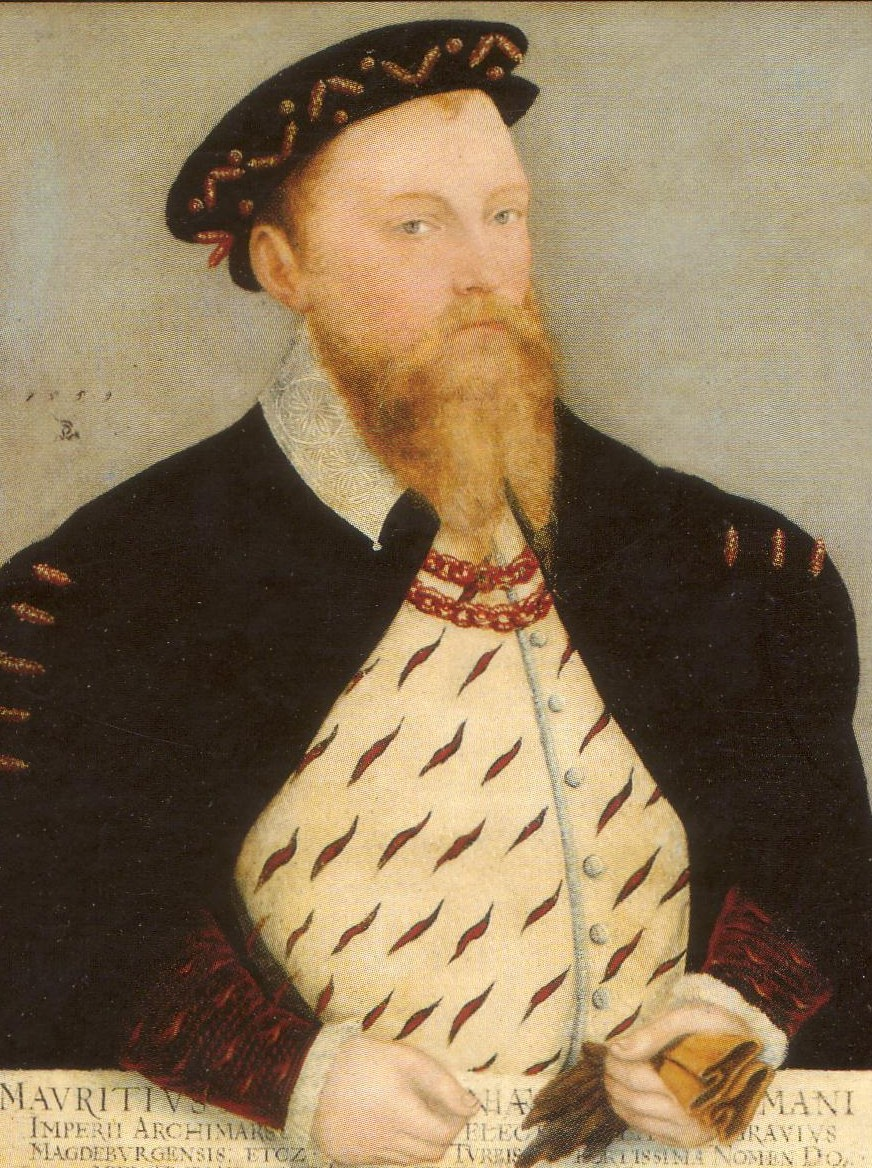
- Portrait by Lucas Cranach the Younger, 1559

Elector of Saxony
- Reign: 24 April 1547 – 9 July 1553
- Predecessor: John Frederick I
- Successor: Augustus

Duke of Saxony
- Reign: 18 August 1541 – 24 April 1547
- Predecessor: Henry IV
- Successor: John Frederick I

Margrave of Meissen
- Reign: 18 August 1541 – 9 July 1553
- Predecessor: Henry IV
- Successor: Merged into the Electorate
- Born: 21 March 1521; Freiberg, Electorate of Saxony, Holy Roman Empire
- Died: 9 July 1553 (aged 32); Sievershausen (near Lehrte), Principality of Brunswick-Wolfenbüttel, Holy Roman Empire
- Burial: Freiberg Cathedral
- Spouse: Agnes of Hesse (m. 1541)
- Issue: Anna, Princess of Saxony and Orange-Nassau; Prince/Duke Albrecht of Saxony
- House: Wettin (Albertine line)
- Father: Henry IV, Duke of Saxony
- Mother: Catherine of Mecklenburg-Schwerin
- Religion: Roman Catholic (1521–1536); Lutheran (1536–1553)

Maurice (German: Moritz; 21 March 1521 – 9 July 1553) was Duke of Saxony from 1541 to 1553, who became Prince-Elector and Arch-Marshal of the Holy Roman Empire in 1547. Through shrewd political maneuvering, skillfully exploiting alliances and rivalries, he secured extensive territories and the electoral title for the Albertine branch of the Wettin dynasty.

Maurice succeeded his father as duke of Saxony in 1541. Though a Protestant, he initially backed Emperor Charles V in several wars, then in 1545 accepted the Emperor's promise of the Saxon electorship and turned against the rival Ernestine branch—helping seize Electoral Saxony. After John Frederick's defeat at Mühlberg (1547), Maurice was rewarded with the electoral title and large new lands.

He soon broke with Charles, angered by plans to restore Catholicism in Protestant territories and by the continued imprisonment of his father-in-law, Philip I of Hesse. Although sent to subdue Magdeburg in 1550, Maurice used the mission to raise an army and forge alliances with France and Protestant princes. In 1552, their campaign forced the Emperor to flee and Philip to be released, and the Treaty of Passau (1552) temporarily safeguarded Lutheran interests. Maurice later returned to the imperial side, but was killed in 1553 after defeating Albert Alcibiades at the Battle of Sievershausen.

== 1521–1541: Infancy and youth ==
Maurice was the fourth child but first son of the future Henry IV, Duke of Saxony, then a Catholic, and his Protestant wife, Catherine of Mecklenburg-Schwerin. Henry was the younger brother of George, Duke of Saxony.

In December 1532, Maurice, aged 11, came to live at the castle of his godfather, Cardinal Albert of Brandenburg, Archbishop of Magdeburg and Mainz. For two years, he lived a contemplative life until his uncle Duke George demanded his return to Saxony. George began the training of the future duke and educated him as a Catholic. But in 1536 Maurice's father converted to Protestantism, and when he succeeded George as Duke in 1539, he made the duchy Protestant.

Henry and Catherine took the education of their son into their hands. In 1539 Maurice, now 18 years old, went to live in Torgau with his older cousin John Frederick I, Elector of Saxony, whom he despised; this led to a strong hatred between them. With another cousin, however, Philip I, Landgrave of Hesse, whom he met in Dresden, Maurice struck up a lifelong friendship.

With Maurice now of age, his parents began to look for a wife for him. The favorite was Philip's eldest daughter, Agnes. The marriage plans threatened to fail, however, because of the illegal double marriage of the Landgrave. Without the knowledge of his parents, Maurice remained committed to his engagement with Agnes. The wedding, particularly disapproved of by his mother, took place in Marburg on 9 January 1541. Letters from that time illustrate the strong mutual devotion of the couple. Together they had two children:

1. Anna (b. Dresden, 23 December 1544 – d. Dresden, 18 December 1577), married on 24 August 1561 to Prince William I of Orange-Nassau. They divorced in 1574
2. Albert (b. Dresden, 28 November 1545 – d. Dresden, 12 April 1546) died in infancy.

== 1541–1548: The Wurzener Feud and the Schmalkaldic War ==
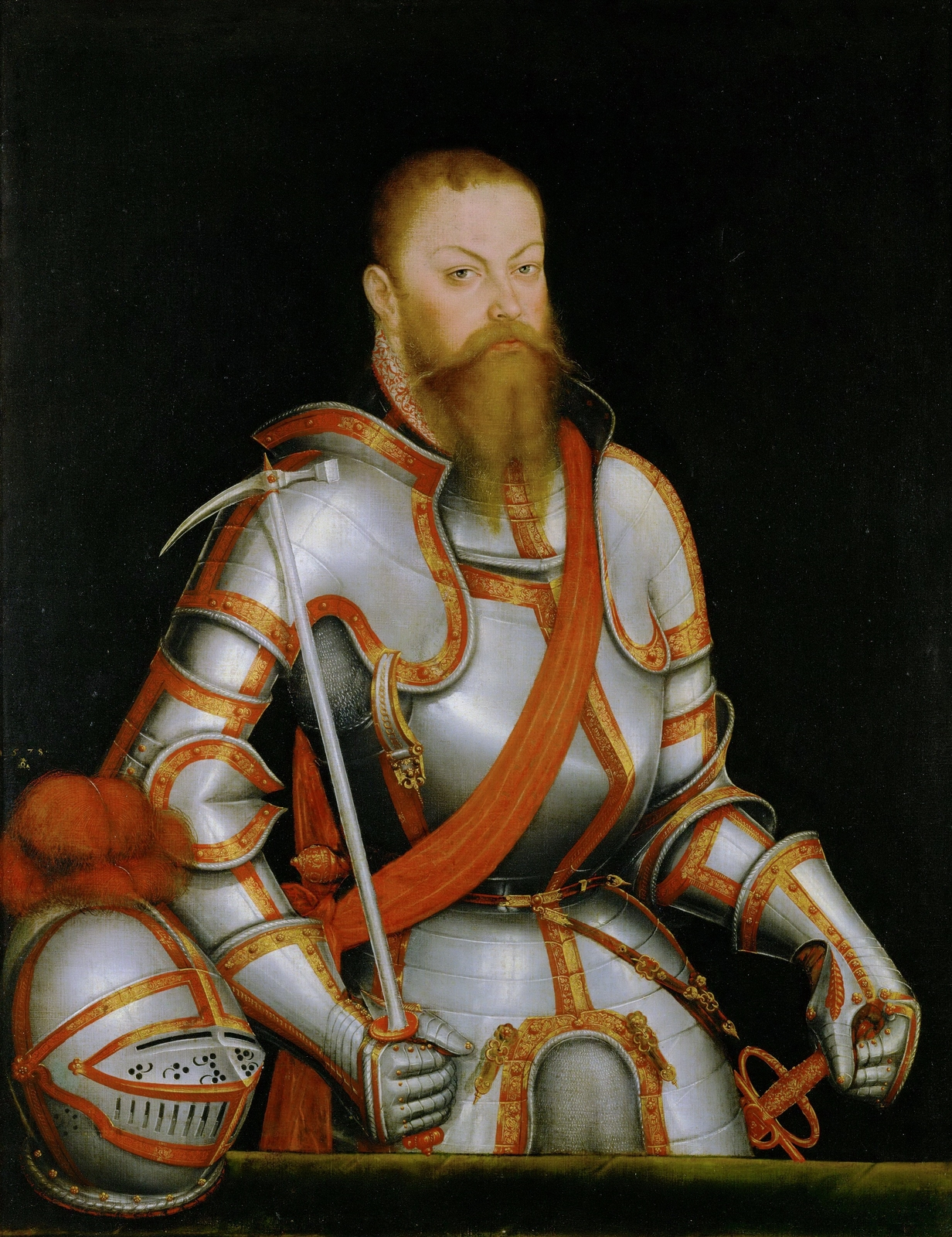
Portrait of Maurice in armour, by Lucas Cranach the Younger.

On 18 August 1541 Henry died, and Maurice, as the eldest son, succeeded him as duke of Saxony and head of the Albertine Line. He replaced most of his advisors, because they had been opposed to his marriage with Agnes from the very start. George von Carlowitz, one of the new confidants of the Duke, advised Maurice (in order to prevent a war with Emperor Charles V and his brother Ferdinand, at the same time King of the Romans and his neighbour as King of Bohemia) not to endanger the survival of the Protestant Movement.

Thus he participated in the emperor's army in the war against the forces of Suleiman the Magnificent of the Ottoman Empire (1542), William of Jülich-Cleves-Berg (1543), and Francis I of France (1544). At the same time, the duke confiscated the properties of the Catholic Church in his lands. From the wealth of dissolved monasteries in his country Maurice founded the princes' schools (Fürstenschulen) of Schulpforta (100 places), Meissen (60 places) and Grimma (70 places). The legal basis for this was the "New National Order" (Neue Landesordnung) of 1543.

Later, Maurice refused to join the Protestant Schmalkaldic League, although Philip of Hesse, his friend and father-in-law, was its leader. The principal reason for his refusal to do so is generally regarded as his hate for his Ernestine cousin John Frederick I and the Imperial promise of the Saxon electorship, then held by John Frederick. In the Holy Week of 1542, in the process of the Wurzener Feud (Wurzener Fehde) it nearly came to a fratricidal war, because John Frederick occupied the jointly administered "Wurzener Country". There had previously been a controversy between Maurice and John Frederick over the use of tax funds from this area. The intervention of the Landgrave Philip of Hesse and Martin Luther prevented the war.

Due to the energetic persistence of the Elector John Frederick in establishing the Protestant Faith, the Emperor Charles V, on 20 July 1546, imposed the Imperial Ban (Reichsacht) on him, with the agreement of the Catholic Imperial Estates, the enforcement of which was laid on Maurice after the Wurzener Feud. The emperor tried in this way to drive a still deeper wedge into the Protestant camp in order to prevent a further propagation of the Protestant Faith. In the case of a successful enforcement, Maurice hoped to be invested by the emperor with the electorship. Maurice hesitated for a long time, since by this punitive action his father-in-law Philip of Hesse would have been affected also. But when the brother of the emperor, Ferdinand I, himself wanted to initiate a campaign against the Electorate of Saxony, he had to call it off, in order not to lose the initiative in his own lands to the Habsburgs.

Maurice returned to Charles's camp. After initial successes — he occupied the Electorate of Saxony nearly without a fight — Maurice with his army was driven back by the Schmalkaldic League and retreated towards Bohemia. In the crucial Battle of Mühlberg on the Elbe, the Emperor and his brother Ferdinand, as well as Maurice, were able to defeat the Schmalkaldic League by capturing Landgrave Philip and John Frederick. According to contemporary chronicles, all of this happened on the same day, 24 April 1547. In order to escape being beheaded, John Frederick ceded the electorate and sizable lands to Maurice in the Capitulation of Wittenberg. In a brief ceremony in the field camp after the battle on 4 June 1547 Duke Maurice of Saxony was raised to the dignified position of elector of Saxony. The official appointment took place later, but at a high price: He had betrayed the Protestant Faith and had brought his father-in-law, Philip of Hesse, into a hopeless situation. Maurice assured him that he would not be imprisoned, if he would surrender to the emperor. However, Philip was taken prisoner and exiled, after he had fallen on his knees before Charles V.

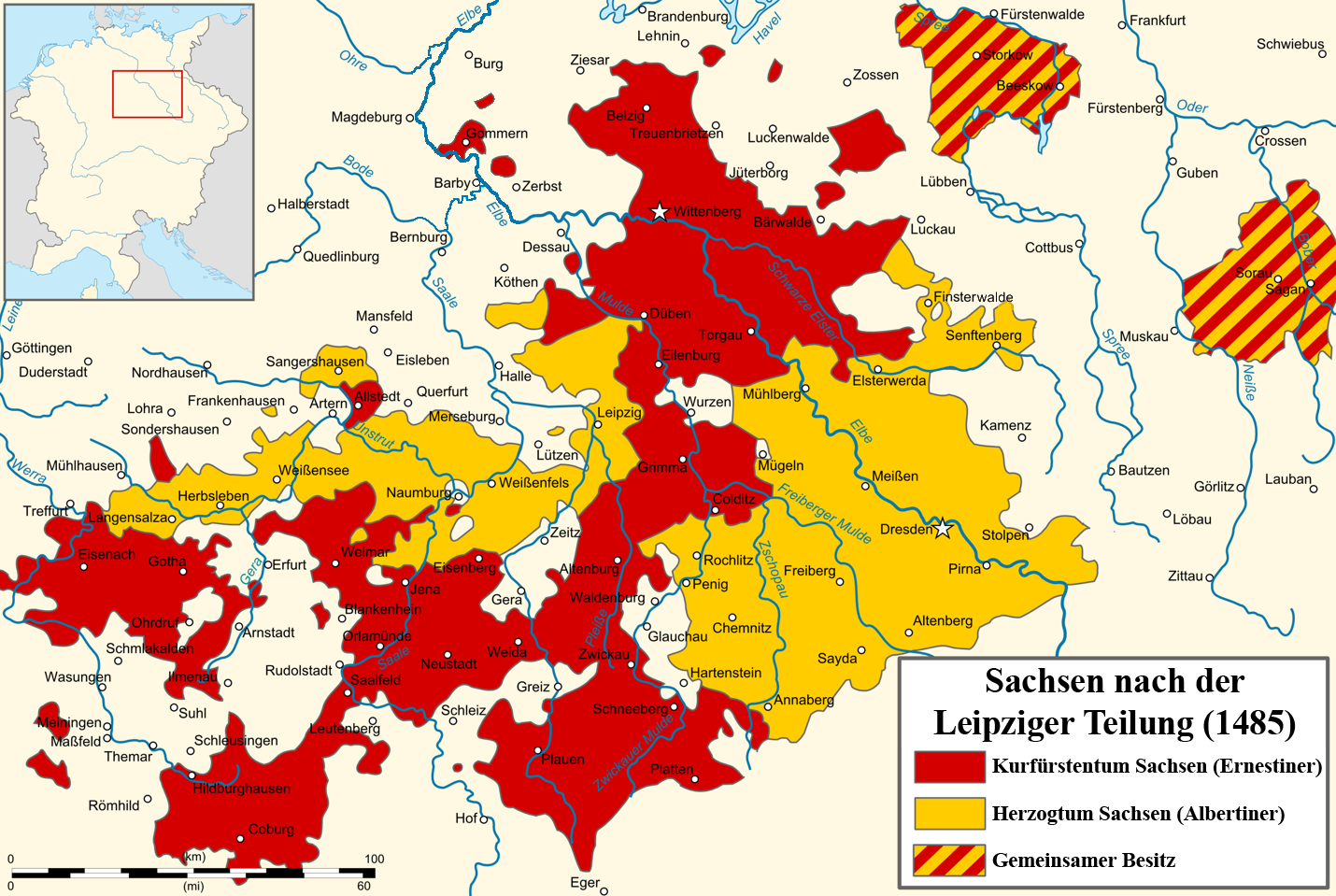
Albertine domains (yellow) upon the Treaty of Leipzig (1485)

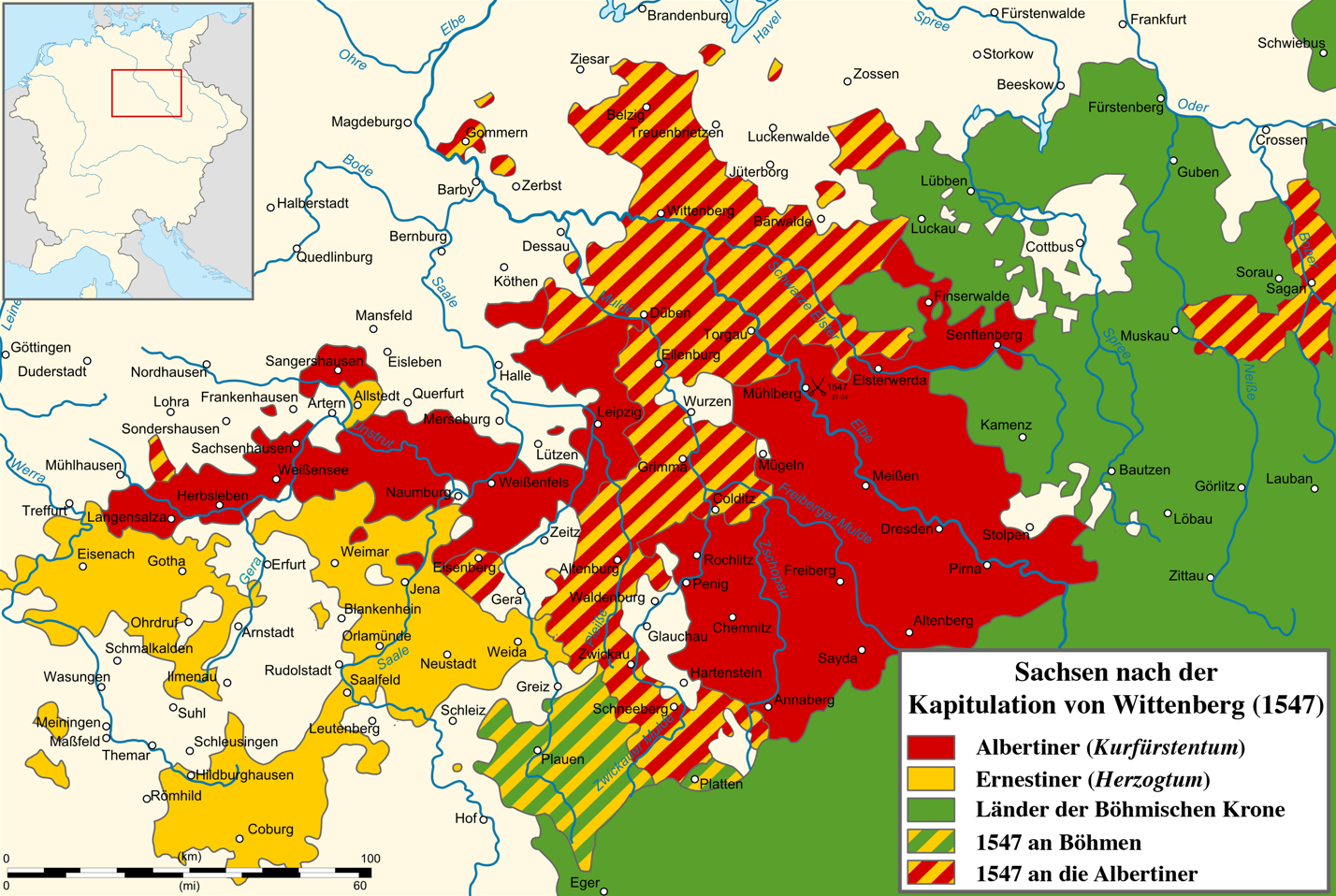
Albertine domains (red and shaded) upon the Capitulation of Wittenberg (1547)

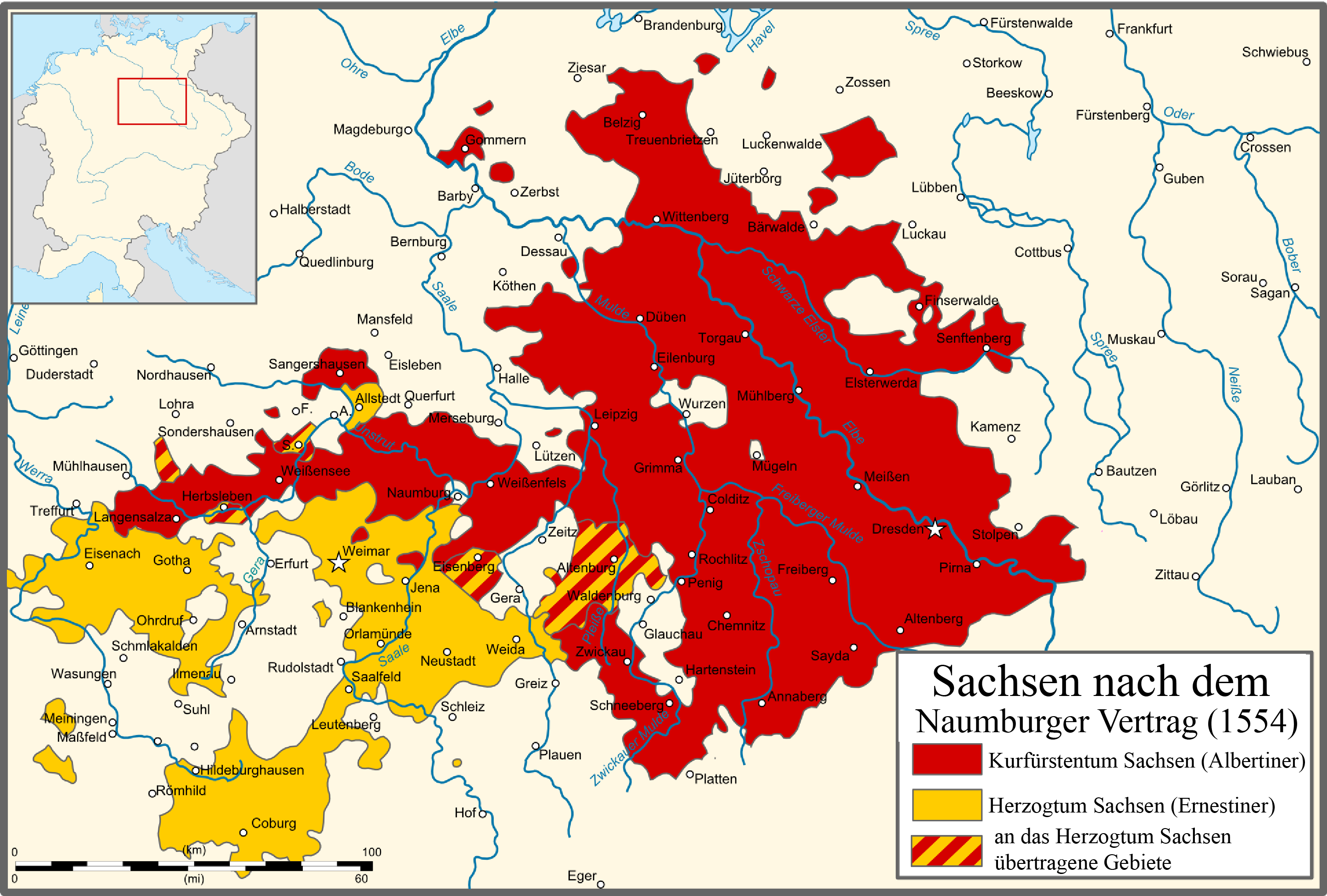
Albertine domains (red and shaded) upon the Treaty of Naumburg (1554)

== 1548–1553: The Diet of Augsburg and the Peace of Passau ==
Maurice, insulted after these incidents by his compatriots and called a "Judas", was also disappointed by the emperor's attitude (because now Charles V tried to reintroduce Catholicism into the Empire's Protestant territories and continued the imprisonment of his father-in-law, Landgrave Philip of Hesse, whose freedom Charles V had guaranteed), he hid his feelings from him up to the Diet of Augsburg on 25 February 1548, where the ceremony of the formal inauguration of Maurice as elector of Saxony took place.

Charles V hoped that, with Maurice's appointment as the elector of Saxony, with the signing of the agreement known as the Augsburg Interim, and with his own assistance, they could put an end to the religious strife that was splitting his empire.

When commissioned to capture the rebellious Lutheran city of Magdeburg (1550), Maurice seized the opportunity to raise an army and signed anti-Habsburg compacts with France and Germany's Protestant princes.

In the Treaty of Chambord signed with the French King Henry II in January 1552 Maurice promised the King money and weapons to assist him in his campaign against Charles V. In return, Henry was able to take four Imperial cities (Metz, Toul, Verdun and Cambrai) as well as their bishoprics, although Maurice had no right to them.

In March 1552 the rebels overran the southern German states, including parts of Austria, forcing the Emperor to flee and release Philip of Hesse. While Henry advanced up to the Rhine and occupied the promised Imperial lands, the emperor surprised by the attack fled over the Alps to Villach in the Austrian Duchy of Carinthia. During 1552, Maurice of Saxony led a Protestant revolt to conserve princely freedoms. This revolt was initiated by the imprisonment of John Frederick I of Saxony and by tensions surrounding the will of Charles V. Ultimately, Maurice was successful as he enlisted the help of Henry II of France in order to force Charles' forces to flee.

In view of this success, Maurice abandoned his alliance with Henry II and negotiated a treaty with Charles's brother King Ferdinand I, to which Charles willingly agreed. When the Peace of Passau, was signed in August 1552, the Lutheran position was provisionally guaranteed.

As part of the Peace, his former opponents from the Schmalkaldic War, John Frederick I of Saxony and the Landgrave Philipp of Hesse were released. The war was terminated in 1556 by Ferdinand I; the Imperial cities remained in possession of the French.

When Maurice returned to Saxony after the Peace of Passau, he was no longer seen as a traitor; both Protestants and Catholics rendered him equal respect. In addition the emperor in correspondence to both parties exhorted them to maintain peace in his empire; shortly after, he campaigned against the Ottomans in Hungary.

The Margrave Albert Alcibiades of Brandenburg-Kulmbach (who had rejected the Passau armistice) soon afterwards conquered the bishoprics of Würzburg and Bamberg — which had been under his control for eleven years previously, after their former owner, John Frederick had ceded them to him. This was the beginning of the Second Margrave War, which only ended with the Peace of Augsburg of 1555.

In 1552, Maurice, with the army of the Holy Roman Empire (11,000 men), marched into Hungary. The Ottomans besieged Eger, but the Black Death broke out in Hungary, and Maurice did not dare to move up his forces.

== Death ==
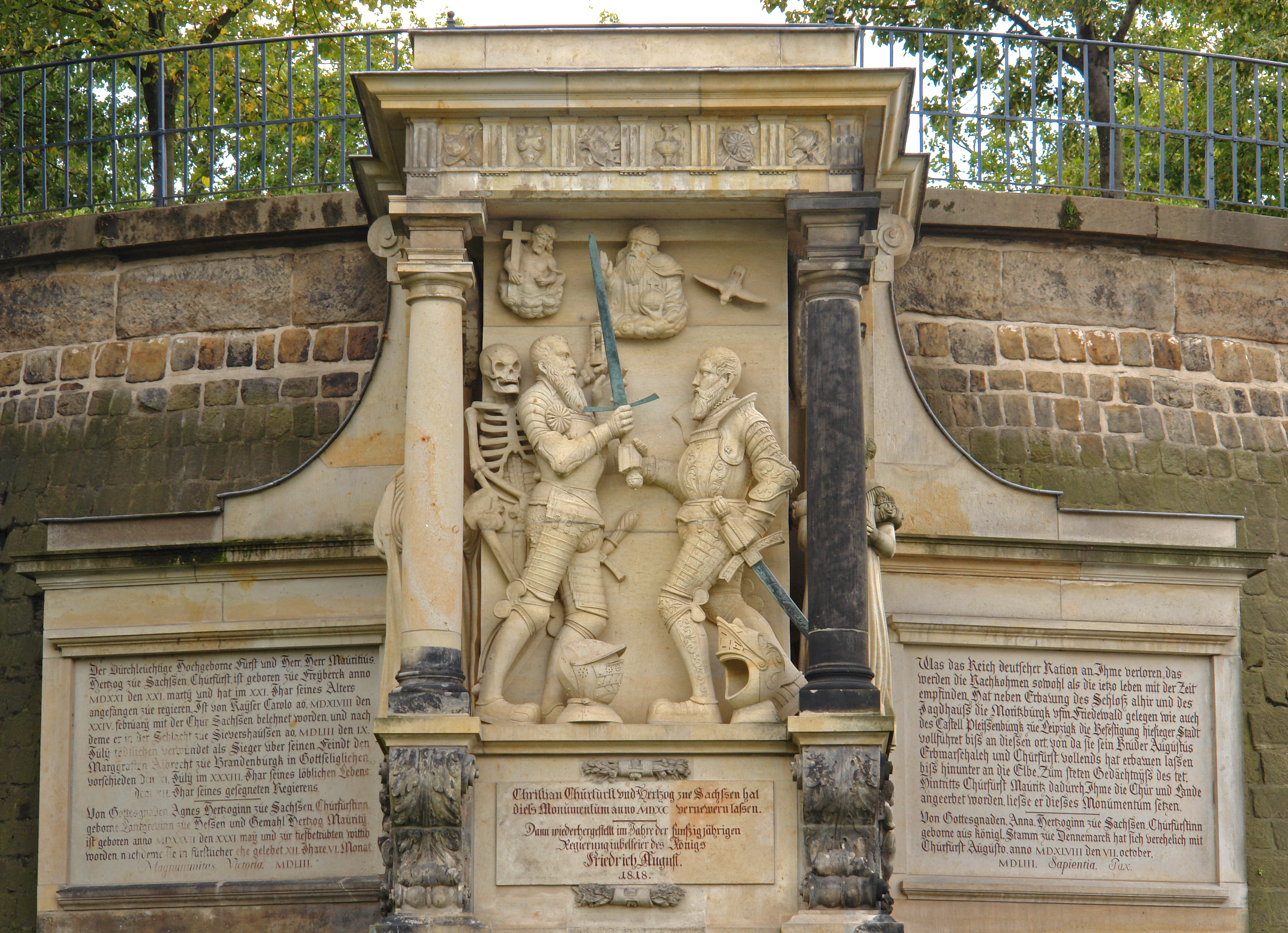
Moritzmonument in Dresden

Albert Alcibiades was a former ally of Maurice, who had fought in the Schmalkaldic War on his side. But now Maurice, involved in an alliance of princes, with Ferdinand I amongst others, was compelled to fight against Albert Alcibiades. On 9 July 1553 the Battle of Sievershausen took place at Lehrte. Maurice won this battle, but was badly wounded in the stomach by a shot from the rear and succumbed two days later in the field camp at the age of 32. He was buried in Freiberg Cathedral. In 1853, 300 years after the battle, the place of his death was commemorated by a monument erected to his memory. The 7.5 ton heavy granite monument came from his native Saxony. The original monument is now in the Rustkammer museum in Dresden, with a simplified version being recreated in its outer location.

Because Maurice died without a surviving male heir, his brother Augustus succeeded him as Elector. In Dresden, shortly after the death of Maurice, he erected the Maurice Monument (Moritzmonument), the first historical monument to be erected in Saxony.

== See also ==
- Leipzig University Library

== Sources ==
- Baumgarten, Hans. Moritz von Sachsen, Berlin 1941.
- Blaschke, Karlheinz. Moritz von Sachsen. Ein Reformationsfürst der zweiten Generation. Göttingen 1983.
- Brandenburg, Eric. Moritz von Sachsen, Bd. I, Leipzig 1899.
- Groß, Reiner (2007). Die Wettiner. Stuttgart: Kohlhammer Verlag.
- Wartenberg, Günther. Landesherrschaft und Reformation. Moritz von Sachsen und die albertinische Kirchenpolitik bis 1546. Weimar 1988.
- Johannes Herrmann, Moritz von Sachsen. Beucha 2003.
- Hof und Hofkultur unter Moritz von Sachsen (1521–1553), hrsg. von André Thieme und Jochen Vötsch, unter Mitarbeit von Ingolf Gräßler im Auftrag des Vereins für sächsische Landesgeschichte, Beucha 2004.
- This article incorporates text from a publication now in the public domain: Chisholm, Hugh, ed. (1911). "Maurice, elector of Saxony". Encyclopædia Britannica (11th ed.). Cambridge University Press.
- Hans-Joachim Böttcher, Anna Prinzessin von Sachsen (1544-1577) - Eine Lebenstragödie, Dresden 2013, ISBN 978-3-941757-39-4.
- Wilson, Peter H. (2016). Heart of Europe: A History of the Holy Roman Empire. Cambridge: Harvard University Press.

Maurice, Elector of Saxony House of Wettin Born: 21 March 1521 Died: 9 July 1553
Regnal titles
Preceded by Henry IV	Duke of Saxony; 1541–1547	Succeeded by John Frederick I
Preceded by John Frederick I	Elector of Saxony; 1547–1553	Succeeded by Augustus
