= Stokrooie =

Sub-municipality of the city of Hasselt, Belgium

- Sub-municipality of Hasselt
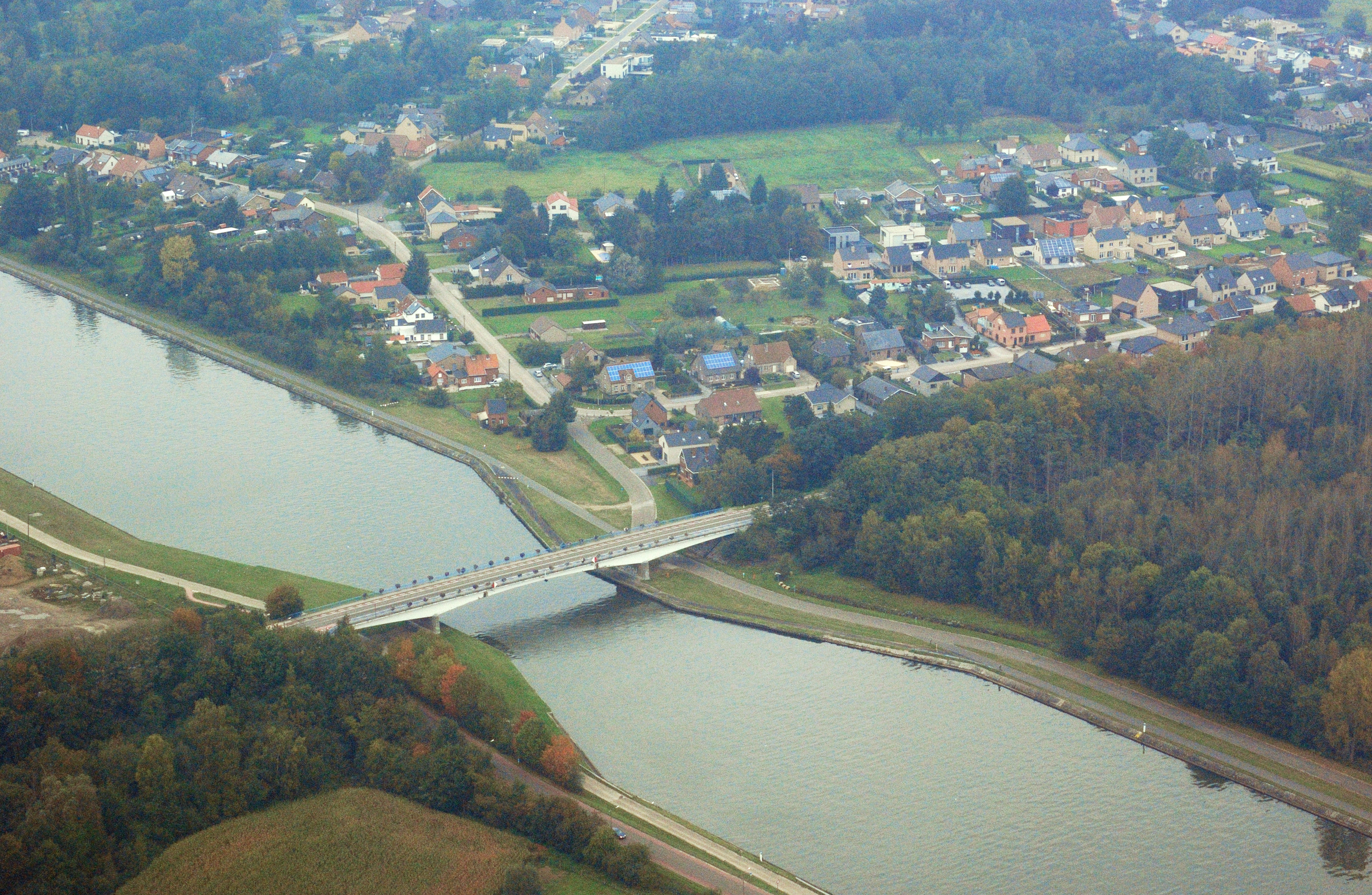
- Aerial photograph of the Albert Canal at Stokrooie
- Interactive map of Stokrooie
- Location within Belgium Location within Limburg (Belgium)
- Coordinates: 50°58′00″N 5°17′00″E
- Country: Belgium
- Community: Flemish Community
- Region: Flemish Region
- Province: Limburg
- Arrondissement: Hasselt
- Municipality: Hasselt

Area
  - Total: 6.36 km^{2} (2.46 sq mi)

Population (2020-01-01)
  - Total: 2,000
  - Density: 310/km^{2} (810/sq mi)
- Postal codes: 3511
- Area codes: 011
- Website: stokrooie.be

Stokrooie (Dutch pronunciation: [ˈstɔkˌroːi.ə]) is a sub-municipality of the city of Hasselt located in the province of Limburg, Flemish Region, Belgium. It was a separate municipality until 1971. In 1971, it was merged into Kuringen. On 1 January 1977, Kuringen was merged into Hasselt.
