= Anna of Saxony =

German noblewoman (1544–1577)

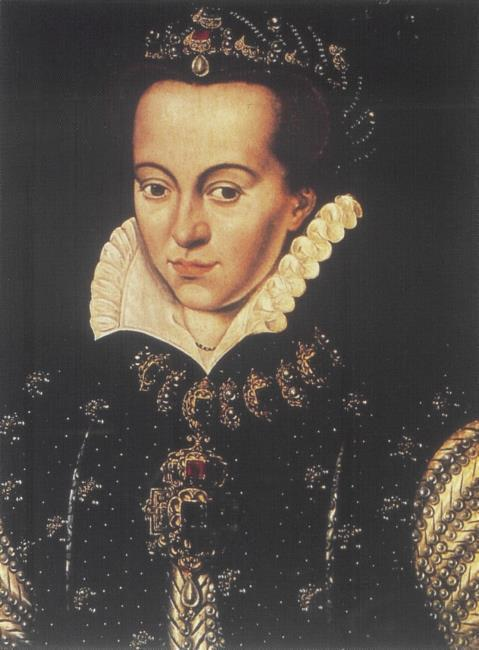
- Portrait after Antonis Mor, c. 1560–1574

Princess consort of Orange
- Tenure: 25 August 1561 – 22 March 1571
- Born: 23 December 1544; Dresden, Duchy of Saxony
- Died: 18 December 1577 (aged 32); Dresden, Electorate of Saxony
- Spouse: William I, Prince of Orange (m. 1561; div. 1571)
- Issue more...: Anna, Countess of Nassau-Dillenburg; Maurice, Prince of Orange; Emilia, Princess of Portugal; Christine von Diez (illegitimate)
- House: Wettin
- Father: Maurice, Elector of Saxony
- Mother: Agnes of Hesse

Anna of Saxony (23 December 1544 – 18 December 1577) was the daughter of Maurice, Elector of Saxony, and Agnes of Hesse. Her wealth drew many suitors; she ultimately accepted the proposal of widowed William the Silent, and they were married on 25 August 1561. They had to flee the Netherlands in 1567 in the face of the Habsburg army dispatched to suppress the Dutch Revolt.

In 1570, Anna began an affair with her lawyer Jan Rubens which resulted in a child. She was put under house arrest, and William had their marriage dissolved. Anna died aged 32, mentally and physically ill.

== Early life ==
Anna was born in Dresden on 23 December 1544, the eldest child of Duke Maurice of Saxony and his wife, Agnes of Hesse. After the death of her younger brother Albert (1545–1546), Anna grew up as an only child, and might have been spoiled by her parents, particularly her mother. There are indications that Anna suffered from a physical deformity (a back problem or uneven shoulders) and that she might have walked with a limp.

After her father's death on 11 July 1553, his younger brother, August (1526–1586), succeeded him as Elector of Saxony, resulting in a loss of Anna's in rank. Shortly afterwards, Anna's mother married Duke Johann Friedrich II of Saxony (1529–1595). On 4 November 1555, six months after her second marriage, her mother died under mysterious circumstances. The 11-year-old orphan then returned to her late father's Dresden court and was placed under the guardianship of her uncle August and his wife, Anne of Denmark and Norway. Sources indicate that the young princess chafed under her aunt's regime, was often unhappy and felt alone. At the same time, she was described as proud, defiant, and stubborn as well as intelligent and passionate.

Due to her late parents' legacies, Anna was considered the wealthiest heiress in Germany at the time. In 1556, Erik, son of the Swedish king Gustav Vasa, sought her hand in marriage, followed two years later by William of Orange. A marriage with a rich heiress and relation to the important electoral houses of Germany for him seemed of great value. Money may have not been one of the main motives for the marriage, but was probably the furthest planned course of the marriage. Anna's maternal grandfather, Philip the Magnanimous of Hesse, was opposed to the marriage. First, he did not consider William of Orange, already having a male heir, as befitting for an elector's daughter, believing she could marry someone of even higher rank. Secondly, there would have been too much debt incurred in the event of William's death. Philip's negative attitude delayed the marriage for a full year. Ultimately, however, the decisive factor was probably that William was a valuable ally for Germany and his Dutch resources for the Protestant cause.

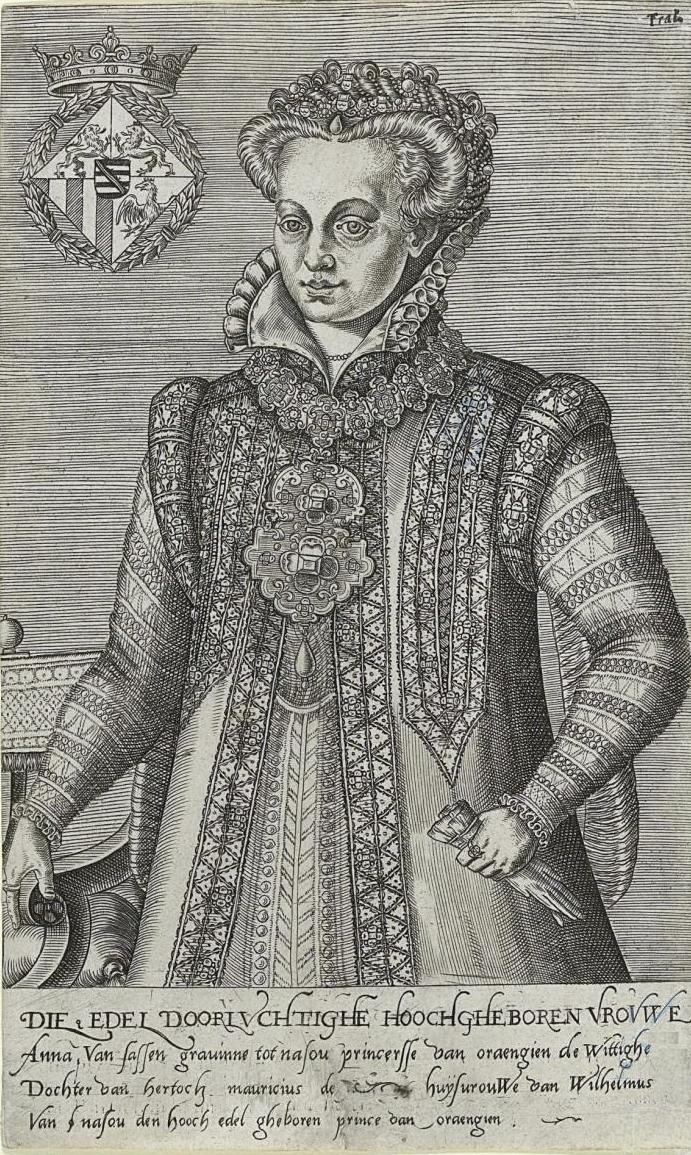
Anna of Saxony—Engraving by Abraham de Bruyn (1566)

== Marriage to William I of Orange-Nassau ==
On 2 June 1561 the marriage contract was signed in Torgau. Anna's dowry would be the large sum of 100,000 thalers. The wedding took place on 24 August 1561 in Leipzig. On 1 September 1561 William of Orange, along with his young wife, relocated to the Netherlands.

The marriage produced five children, of whom three survived to adulthood:

1. Anna (born and died Brussels, 31 October 1562).
2. Anna (Breda, 5 November 1563 – Franeker, 13 June 1588), married on 25 November 1587 to William Louis, Count of Nassau-Dillenburg.
3. Maurice August Philip (Brussels, 8 December 1564 – Brussels, 3 March 1566).
4. Maurice (Dillenburg, 13 November 1567 – The Hague, 23 April 1625), later Prince of Orange and Governor of the Netherlands.
5. Emilia (Köln, 10 April 1569 – Geneva, 6 March 1629), married on 7 November 1597 to Manuel of Portugal.

Just a few months after the wedding, in 1562 difficulties arose between her and her husband. Anna received letters from her uncle meant for William stating he should work more towards pleasing her. Both tried to end the rumours that they had an unhappy marriage. By 1565, it was well known in all the courts of Germany and the Netherlands that the marriage was an unhappy one. Her uncle August tried to save face by making claims that disputes arose due to his brother Louis antagonizing William. In 1566 William finally complained about the "contentious" nature of his wife to her Saxon uncle August and her Hessian uncle Landgrave Wilhelm IV of Hesse-Kassel (1532–1592).

After the death of her first son Maurice in 1566, Anna began to experience severe depression and suicidal thoughts for the first time. She also tried to drown her grief with excessive alcohol consumption.

In 1567 William had to flee due to his opposition to the Habsburg Netherlands, and went with his wife to Dillenburg, the German headquarters of the family. On 14 November 1567 she bore a son and named him Maurice again. At the baptism of 11–19 January 1568 a message arrived for William in Burgundy stating that on 20 December 1567 all his Dutch lands and possessions had been confiscated.

When William returned to Brabant on 15 August 1568 to continue his war against the Spaniards, Anna decided on 20 October 1568 although pregnant again, to leave Dillenburg with her court (probably 43 people), to escape the antipathies of his mother and to create a new home in Cologne. Their two children, Anna and Maurice, had been taken by her mother-in-law to Braunfels due to the risk of disease. The next year, after a fierce battle with William's mother, she was able to bring her children back to him. Her daughter Emilia was born on 10 April 1569 in Cologne.

On 4 March 1569 Anna met her husband in Mannheim. William's campaign against the Duke of Alba had failed, and King Philip II of Spain had forced him out. After this, he left Germany and went to support the Huguenots in France in their faith struggles. Since William could no longer provide for the family, Anna looked to other means of support. She considered either persuading the Duke of Alba to return their confiscated goods, or demanding payment from Wilhelm as specified in the contract of 12,000 guilders or the castles of Diez or Hadamar. This would have meant a severe financial burden to be borne for Nassau. Anna became a substantial risk to the family.

To enforce their claims, they purchased the services of the successful lawyer Jan Rubens in the end of January 1569, the father of the painter Peter Paul Rubens, who had left Antwerp because of his Calvinist faith in 1568, and found refuge in Cologne. The case was begun in January 1570 at the Royal Brussels to take fiscal action for their confiscated goods in the Netherlands.

== Affair ==
Anna desired to see her husband again and met with him in May 1570 in Butzbach to discuss financial matters as well as other important topics. In June 1570, Anna and William moved in together again in Siegen for a few weeks, where she had settled with her three children. It was there where she began an affair with her lawyer Jan Rubens.

During the Christmas holidays from 24 to 26 December 1570 William visited his family there again. It was likely a harmonious time, because he persuaded Anna to visit him in January 1571 in Dillenburg, where she even was willing to forego, for the time, payments from her jointure. She was pregnant again, this time from her lover. William accused Anna of adultery at this point and made plans to separate from her.

Rubens was often with Anna because he was their counsellor, financial advisor and attorney, and thus was suspected of adultery with Anna between 7 and 10 March 1571. He was arrested outside the city of Siegen when he was on his way to see her. He was blackmailed for a suitable confession. Anna was put under pressure too: either they must confess themselves or Rubens would be executed. Anna agreed on 26 March 1571 to plead guilty. On 22 August 1571 Anna's last child, Christine, was born. On the basis of the allegation, William of Orange didn't recognize the child as his daughter. Christine received the name van Dietz. On 14 December 1571 Anna had to sign their consent to the final separation from her husband. In addition, William of Orange was not willing to pay maintenance for her. In 1597 Christine Von Dietz was married to Viscount Johann Wilhelm von Welschenengst-Bernkott. The couple had three children. During the Thirty Years' War, their property was confiscated and after her husband died in 1636, Christina had to seek shelter with relatives. She probably moved in with her daughter Katharina. After her death, Christina was buried in the cathedral of Meissen.

== Imprisonment and death ==
In September 1572 Anna decided to challenge the Imperial Court's ruling for her financial rights. At this time her Hessian and Saxon relatives had already made plans to turn Beilstein castle into a prison, to hold her captive as an adulteress. On 1 October 1572, she was brought there with her youngest daughter Christine. Three years later, her daughter was taken from her.

In March of that year, although the divorce was not finalized, the first news appeared of an impending remarriage of William of Orange. His chosen wife was the former Abbess of Jouarre, Charlotte de Bourbon-Montpensier, a daughter of Louis II of Bourbon, Duke of Montpensier, and his first wife, Jacqueline de Longwy. Outraged at this news, some of Anna's relatives demanded the return of large wedding gifts despite her possible infidelity. Her Uncle August also demanded of William, whom he now called "Head of all the rogues and rebels " claimed one of the counties of Nassau, Hadamar and Diez. He also insisted that the marriage of the prince was not legally ended yet, and thus he had no right to remarry or confiscate her property. Anna did not admit her adultery in court, and if she did, then she could have proven that the prince had broken his marriage agreement. He also ordered the immediate transfer of his niece from Nassau to Saxony.

When Anna learned in December 1575 of her upcoming transferral to Saxony, she attempted suicide. After a long stay in Zeitz, she was taken to Dresden in December 1576. There, the windows of her room were walled up and fitted with additional iron bars. The only entrance was a door covered by an iron grill, with a square hole cut into it so that food and drink could be passed to her, making it virtually impossible to escape.

Anna died on 18 December 1577, likely of neglect, and was buried in Meissen.

== Ancestry ==
Ancestors of Anna of Saxony

16. Frederick II, Elector of Saxony
8. Albert III, Duke of Saxony (=28)
17. Margaret of Austria
4. Henry IV, Duke of Saxony
18. George of Poděbrady
9. Sidonie of Poděbrady (=29)
19. Kunigunde of Sternberg
2. Maurice, Elector of Saxony
20. Henry IV, Duke of Mecklenburg
10. Magnus II, Duke of Mecklenburg (=26)
21. Dorothea of Brandenburg
5. Catherine of Mecklenburg
22. Eric II, Duke of Pomerania
11. Sophie of Pomerania (=27)
23. Sophie of Pomerania
1. Anna of Saxony
24. Louis II, Landgrave of Lower Hesse
12. William II, Landgrave of Hesse
25. Mechthild of Württemberg-Urach
6. Philip I, Landgrave of Hesse
26. Magnus II, Duke of Mecklenburg (=10)
13. Anna of Mecklenburg-Schwerin
27. Sophie of Pomerania-Stettin (=11)
3. Agnes of Hesse
28. Albert III, Duke of Saxony (=8)
14. George, Duke of Saxony
29. Sidonie of Poděbrady (=9)
7. Christine of Saxony
30. Casimir IV Jagiellon
15. Barbara Jagiellon
31. Elisabeth of Austria
