= Kuringen =

Sub-municipality of the city of Hasselt, Belgium

- Sub-municipality of Hasselt
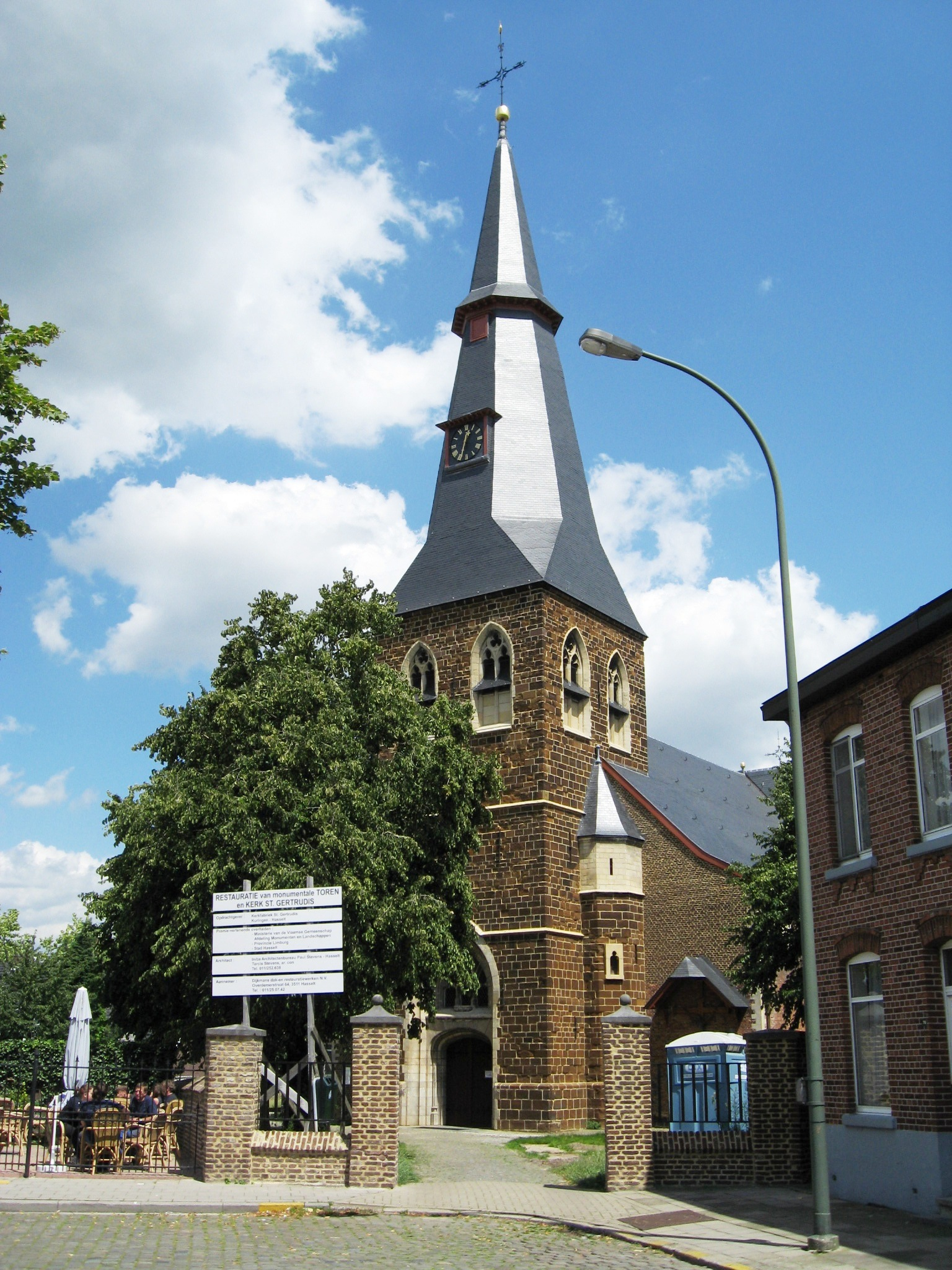
- Church of Saint Gertrude
- Interactive map of Kuringen
- Location within Belgium Location within Limburg (Belgium)
- Coordinates: 50°57′00″N 5°18′00″E
- Country: Belgium
- Community: Flemish Community
- Region: Flemish Region
- Province: Limburg
- Arrondissement: Hasselt
- Municipality: Hasselt

Area
  - Total: 19.48 km^{2} (7.52 sq mi)

Population (2020-01-01)
  - Total: 11,466
  - Density: 588.6/km^{2} (1,524/sq mi)
- Postal codes: 3511
- Area codes: 011
- Website: kuringen.com

Kuringen (Dutch: [ˈkyːrɪŋə(n)]; French: Curange [kyʁɑ̃ʒ]) is a sub-municipality of the city of Hasselt located in the province of Limburg, Flemish Region, Belgium. It was a separate municipality until 1977. In 1971, Stokrooie was merged into Kuringen. On 1 January 1977, Kuringen was merged into Hasselt.
