= Beveren =

- Municipality
- Flag Coat of arms

- Location of Beveren in East Flanders
- Interactive map of Beveren
- Location in Belgium
- Coordinates: 51°12′N 04°15′E
- Country: Belgium
- Community: Flemish Community
- Region: Flemish Region
- Province: East Flanders
- Arrondissement: Sint-Niklaas

Government
  - Mayor: Marc Van de Vijver (CD&V)
  - Governing parties: CD&V, N-VA

Population (2023-01-01)
  - Total: 50,281
- Postal codes: 9120, 9130
- NIS code: 46003
- Area codes: 03
- Website: www.beveren.be

Beveren (Dutch pronunciation: [ˈbeːvərə(n)]) is a former municipality and current submunicipality of Beveren-Kruibeke-Zwijndrecht in the Belgian province of East Flanders which comprises the towns of Beveren, Doel, Haasdonk, Kallo, Kieldrecht, Melsele, Verrebroek and Vrasene.

The port of the Waasland (Dutch: Waaslandhaven) is in Beveren, on the left bank of the Schelde, facing the port of Antwerp on the other side of the river.

== History ==
=== Roman origins ===
In Roman times, the Beveren area was at the edge of the sea and heavily influenced by the tides. The earliest inhabitants erected primitive dams, which were later reinforced and built higher by the religious communities that sprang up in the region. The invasions of the Normans in the 9th century prompted the Counts of Flanders and their local vassals to defend this land even more. Among the local nobility were the lords of Beveren, whose territory was eventually ceded to Louis I of Flanders in 1334. Beveren thus became the oldest political centre of the Waasland region — the northeastern part of the historical County of Flanders — basking for more than two centuries in the glory of Flanders and Burgundy.

=== 1570 to the present ===
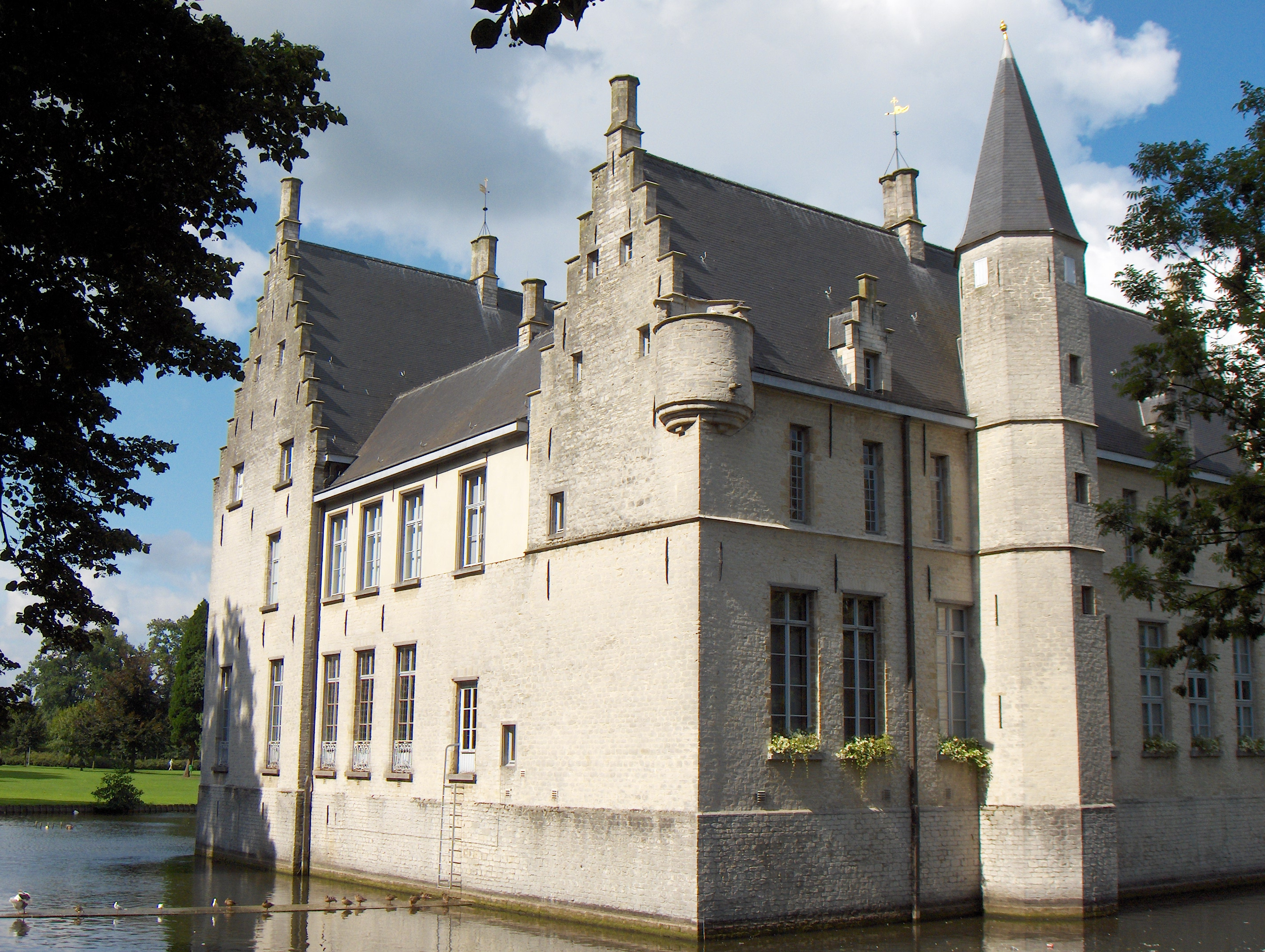
Castle of Cortewalle residence of the Lord of Beveren, the Goubau family.

In 1570, a catastrophic tide flooded the area. For strategic reasons linked to the protection of Antwerp, the local authorities decided to dismantle the remaining dams. Five years later, the rights to the territory were sold. The area closest to the Scheldt was bought by an Antwerp merchant, and the rest went to the Duke of Aarschot. This state of affairs lasted until the French Revolution, when the territory was subdivided into the pre-merger communes. From the 17th century on, the territory had slowly been taken back from the sea, until 1846, when the last parcel of land was dammed up.

Beveren was heavily impacted by the North Sea flood of 1953, which breached the dykes, causing again heavy damage to hundreds of houses. In the 1960s and 1970s, the expansion of the port of Antwerp took place on Kallo's territory. The village of Doel was reduced from the 900 residents of only 10 years ago to some 250 currently because of the expansion of the port. Vast industrial settlements came in its wake, including a nuclear power plant in Doel, which allows Beveren to provide low municipal tax rates for its inhabitants. The opening of the Liefkenshoek car tunnel under the Scheldt in 1991 further improved access to the left bank. Despite all those developments, Beveren has managed to keep its green areas intact and still offers picturesque landscapes to visitors.

== Sights ==
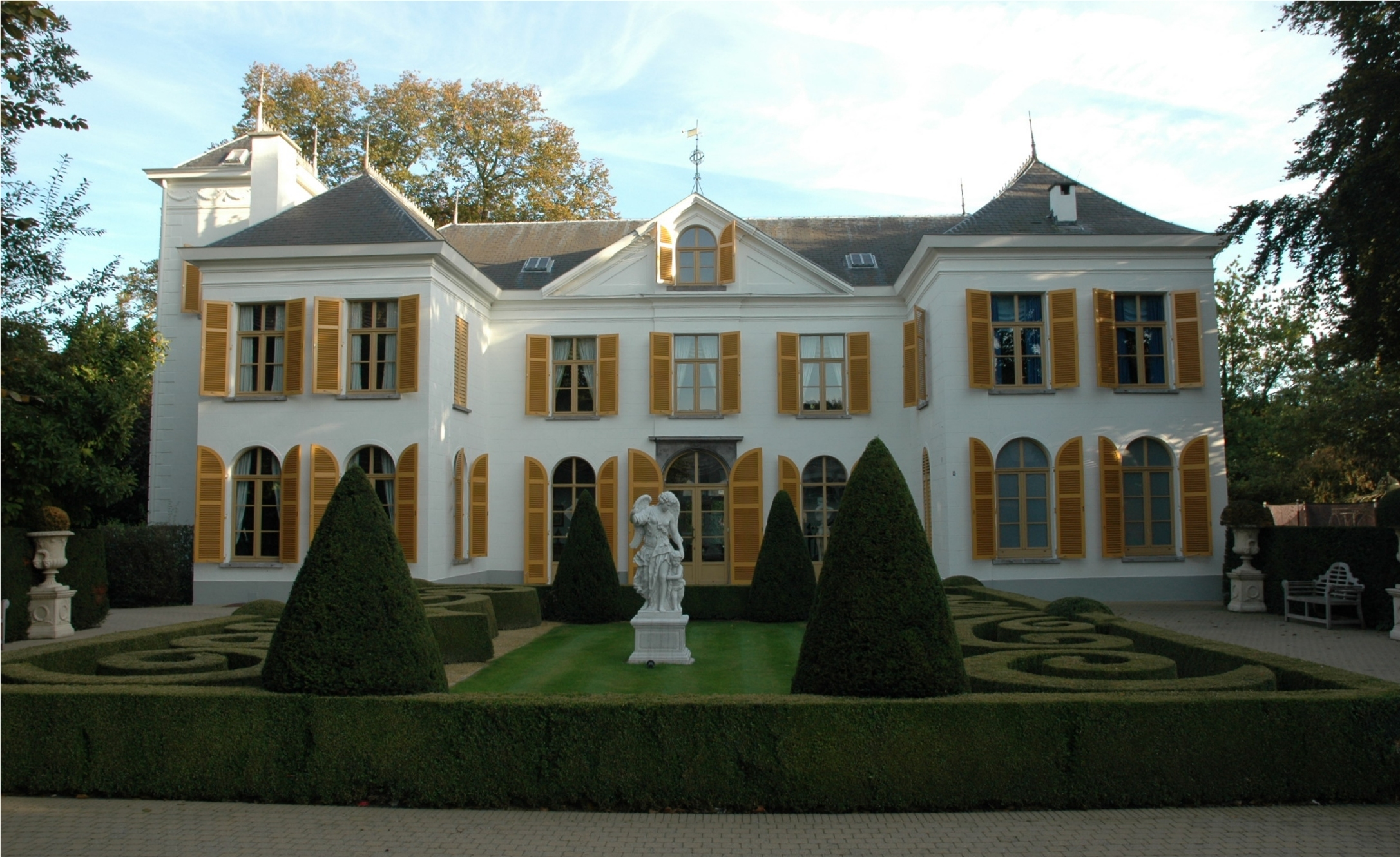
Bosdam Castle

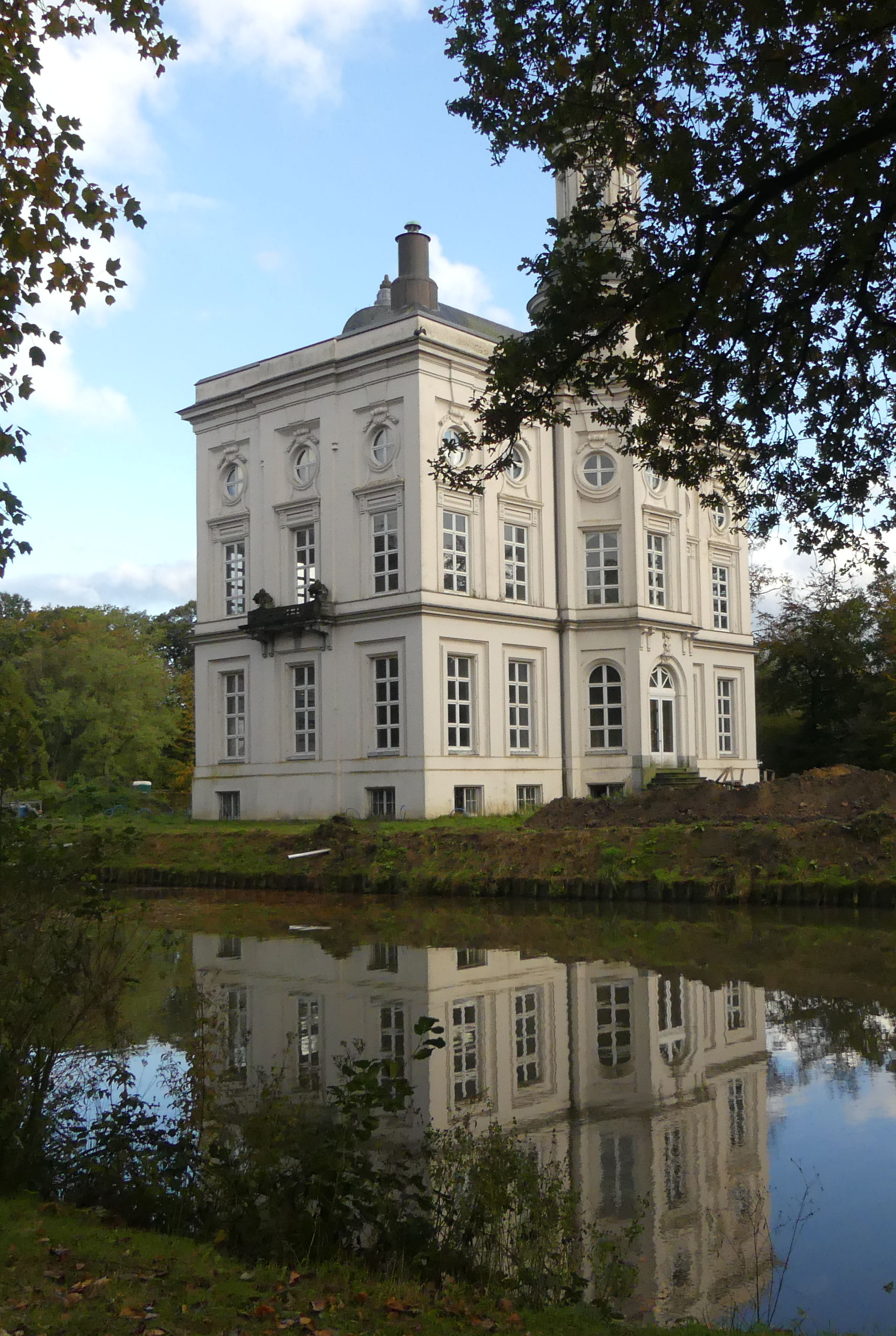
Hof Ter Saksen

- Three castles remain from the feudal era: the 15th-century Castle of Cortewalle, the Bosdam Castle and the Castle Hof Ter Saksen (18th century), which evolved from a medieval inn on the road between Ghent and Antwerp. During the second part of the 20th century, the castle was abandoned and reduced to ruins within a park.
- The Haasdonk fort was built just before World War I for Antwerp's protection. Bunkers can still be seen nearby.
- Beveren has kept several centuries-old houses, manors, chapels and churches.
- The village of Doel houses a 17th-century windmill, one of the oldest in Flanders.
- The polders north of Beveren offer a unique landscape, reminiscent of the southern Netherlands.
- The Freethiel

== Folklore ==
Like many other cities in Belgium, Beveren has a collection of giant puppets who take part in most of the local festivities. The two oldest ones were baptized in 1954.

At Katoen Natie in Kallo one can watch and listen to the Organ collection Ghysels, which was allocated to Museum Vleeshuis in Antwerp. The collection is open for the public since 2010 and waits on at transfer until Vleeshuis has been renovated.

== Climate ==
Beveren has an oceanic climate (Köppen Cfb) with narrow seasonal differences for its latitude. Summers are warm, but occasionally hot, whereas winters usually remain above freezing.

Climate data for Beveren (1981–2010 normals, sunshine 1984–2013)
Month	Jan	Feb	Mar	Apr	May	Jun	Jul	Aug	Sep	Oct	Nov	Dec	Year
Mean daily maximum °C (°F)	6.2 (43.2)	7.0 (44.6)	10.8 (51.4)	14.5 (58.1)	18.4 (65.1)	20.9 (69.6)	23.2 (73.8)	23.0 (73.4)	19.7 (67.5)	15.0 (59.0)	10.1 (50.2)	6.6 (43.9)	14.7 (58.5)
Daily mean °C (°F)	3.5 (38.3)	3.7 (38.7)	6.8 (44.2)	9.5 (49.1)	13.5 (56.3)	16.2 (61.2)	18.4 (65.1)	18.1 (64.6)	15.0 (59.0)	11.3 (52.3)	7.0 (44.6)	4.1 (39.4)	10.6 (51.1)
Mean daily minimum °C (°F)	0.8 (33.4)	0.5 (32.9)	2.9 (37.2)	4.7 (40.5)	8.6 (47.5)	11.5 (52.7)	13.6 (56.5)	13.0 (55.4)	10.5 (50.9)	7.4 (45.3)	4.1 (39.4)	1.5 (34.7)	6.7 (44.1)
Average precipitation mm (inches)	70.2 (2.76)	57.7 (2.27)	63.6 (2.50)	48.4 (1.91)	62.5 (2.46)	77.6 (3.06)	81.6 (3.21)	78.9 (3.11)	78.4 (3.09)	82.0 (3.23)	81.1 (3.19)	80.8 (3.18)	862.7 (33.96)
Average precipitation days	12.5	10.7	11.8	9.5	10.8	10.6	10.4	9.9	10.5	11.8	13.3	13.1	135.1
Mean monthly sunshine hours	60	79	125	179	211	204	215	203	145	118	64	49	1,651
Source: Royal Meteorological Institute

== Famous inhabitants ==
- Valère Gille, poet (1867–1950)
- Wilfried Van Moer, football player (b. 1945)
- Kathleen Smet, triathlon athlete (b. 1970)
- Dominique Cornu, road and track cyclist (b. 1985)
- Julie Gould, British swimmer (b. 1989)

== See also ==
- K.S.K. Beveren
- Asterix Kieldrecht
