= Albert Rubens =

Flemish philologist and numismatist (1614–1657)

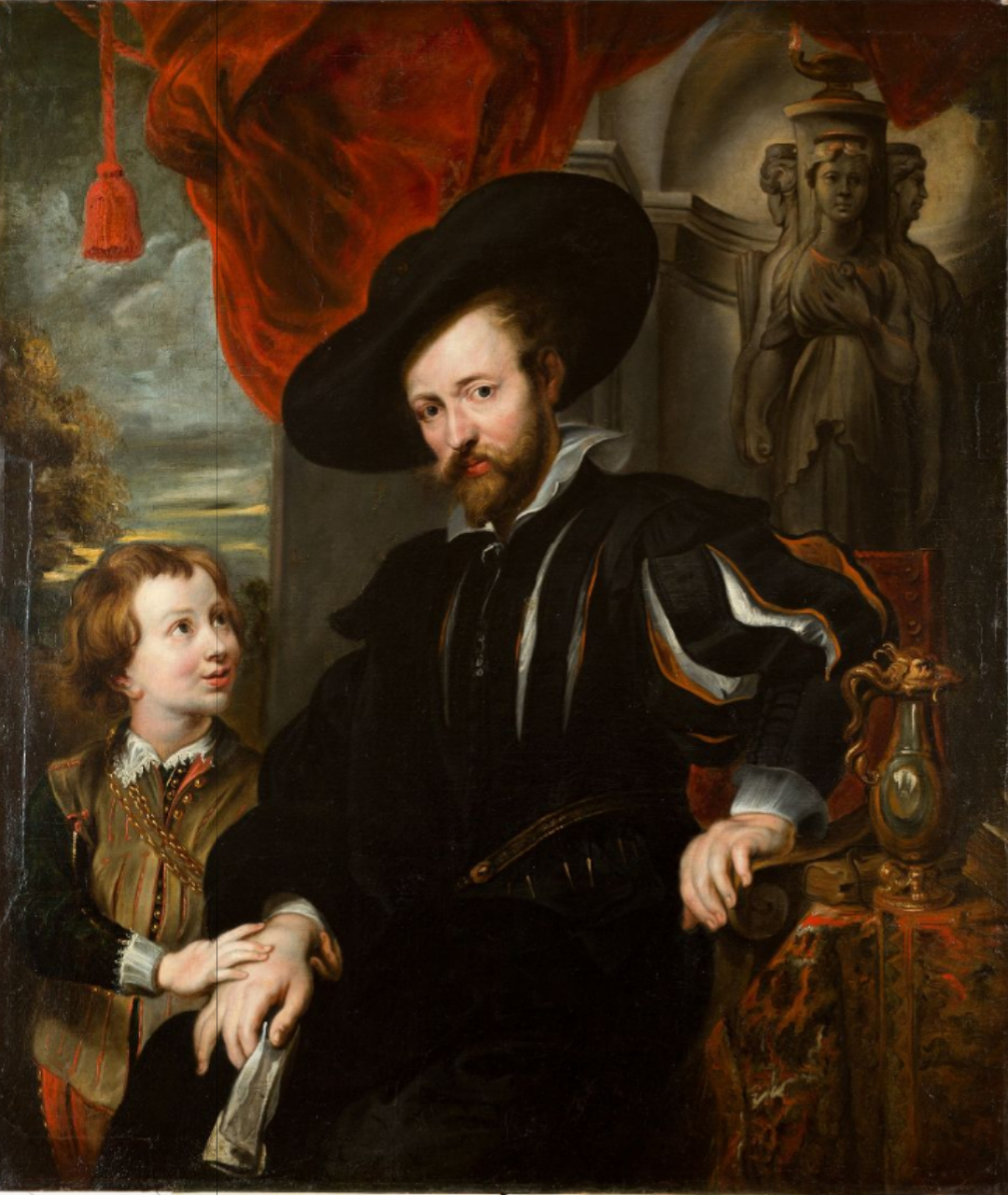
Circle of Rubens, Rubens with his son Albert, 1622–1650, Art Collection of the University of Göttingen

Albert Rubens (1614–1657) was a Flemish philologist and scholar of antiquity, best known as the eldest son of the painter Peter Paul Rubens and his first wife, Isabella Brant. His work on classical literature and antiquarian studies earned him recognition among European scholars. He served in the administration of the Habsburg Netherlands as a secretary of the Privy Council of the Habsburg Netherlands.

== Life ==
Albert Rubens was baptised on 5 June 1614, presumably within a few days of his birth. The governor of the Spanish Netherlands, Albert VII, acted as godfather by proxy. He studied at the Latin school of the Augustinians in Antwerp, where he received a thorough education in classical literature from an early age. He was also tutored by Gaspar Gevartius, a noted scholar and a friend of his father. Under Gevartius, he studied the core humanist subjects of philosophy, numismatics, and the classics.

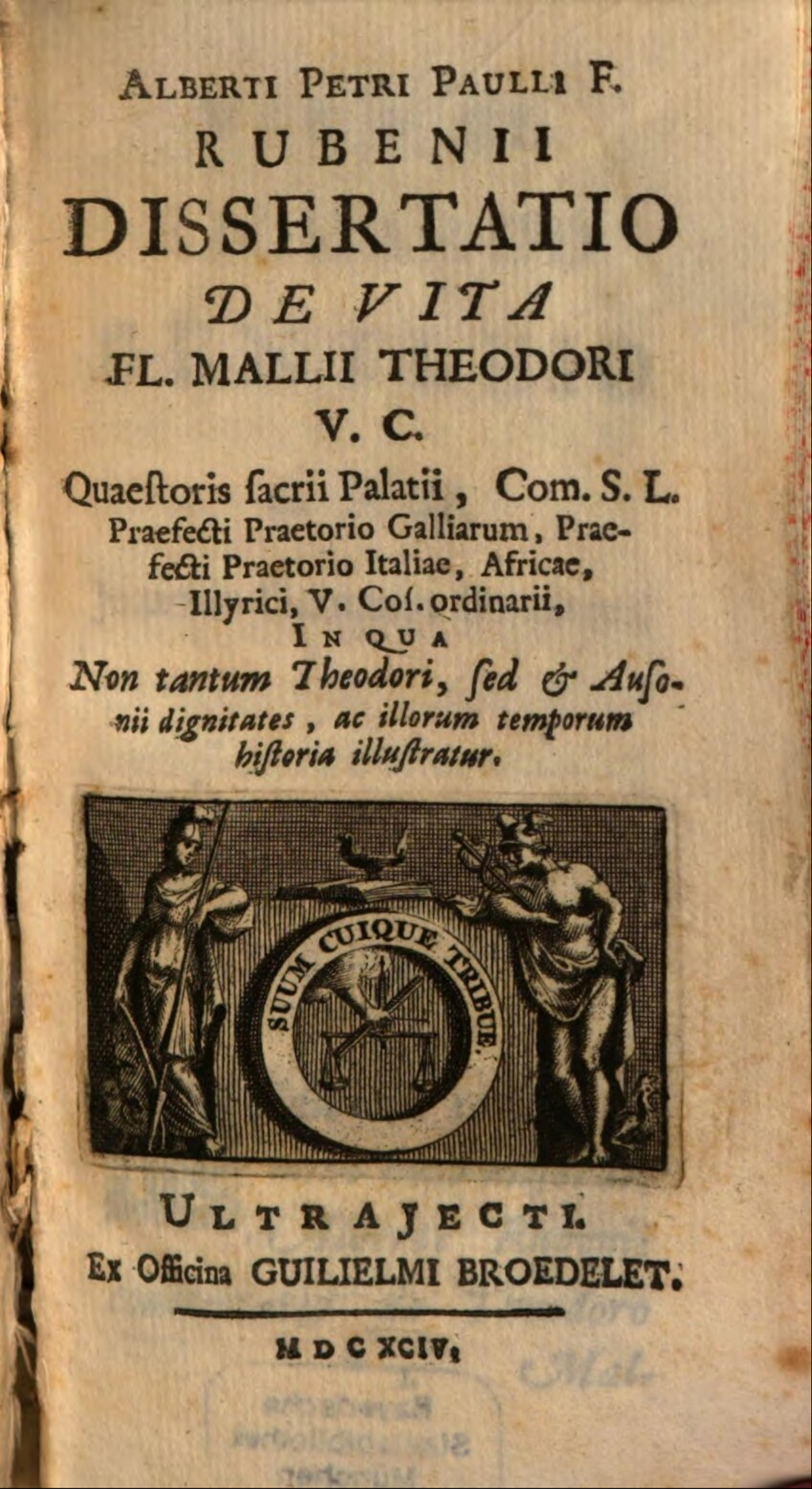
Title page of Dissertatio de vita Fl. Mallii Theodori

Rubens developed a particular interest in Roman antiquity and numismatics. In 1627, he became the youngest recognised poet of Antwerp. One of his poems on antique coins was included in the second edition of Jacob de Bie's book on the ancient coin collection of Charles III de Croÿ, published in 1627 under the title Imperatorum Romanorum numismata aurea a Julio Cæsare ad Heraclium continua serie collecta [...]. His father designed the frontispiece for this publication. Peter Paul Rubens also introduced his son to several renowned scholars of the period, including the French antiquarian Nicolas-Claude Fabri de Peiresc.

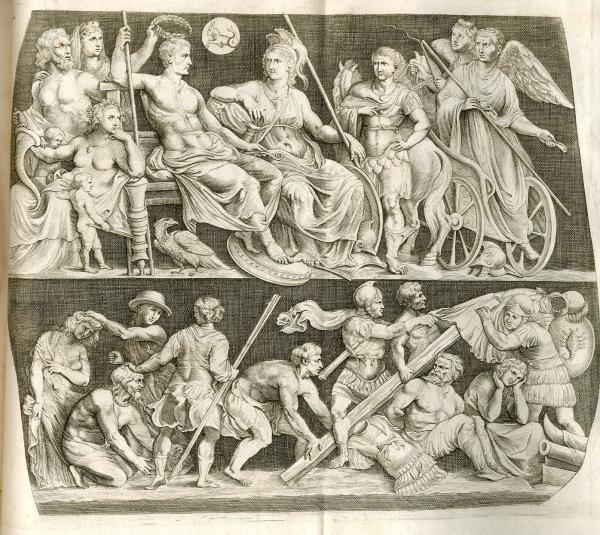
Illustration of the Gemma Augustea from De Re vestiaria veterum, engraved by Cornelis Galle the Younger

When Peter Paul Rubens was sent on a diplomatic mission to the English court in 1630, King Philip IV of Spain first appointed him secretary of the Privy Council of the Habsburg Netherlands, one of the key administrative bodies of the Habsburg Netherlands. The king intended for the position to be inherited by Rubens’ son Albert. Consequently, Albert Rubens was appointed acting secretary of the Privy Council on 15 June 1630. He formally succeeded to the post upon his father's death in 1640. The assurance of a future government office allowed Albert to continue his studies and publish on a range of scholarly subjects. He undertook the customary journey to Italy and was in Venice in 1634.

On 3 January 1641, Rubens married Clara del Monte, daughter of Raymond del Monte (brother of Peter Paul Rubens' friend and travel companion Deodat del Monte) and Susanna Fourment, the elder sister of Albert’s stepmother Helena Fourment. The couple settled in Brussels and had four children: Albert, Isabella, Constantia, and Clara. Their son Albert died in September 1656 after being bitten by a rabid dog, a loss from which his parents never recovered. Albert Rubens died on 1 October 1657, and Clara on 25 November the same year. They were both buried in the Rubens family chapel in St. James' Church in Antwerp. Their three surviving daughters were raised by Albert’s cousin, Filips Rubens, a city clerk in Antwerp.

== Work ==
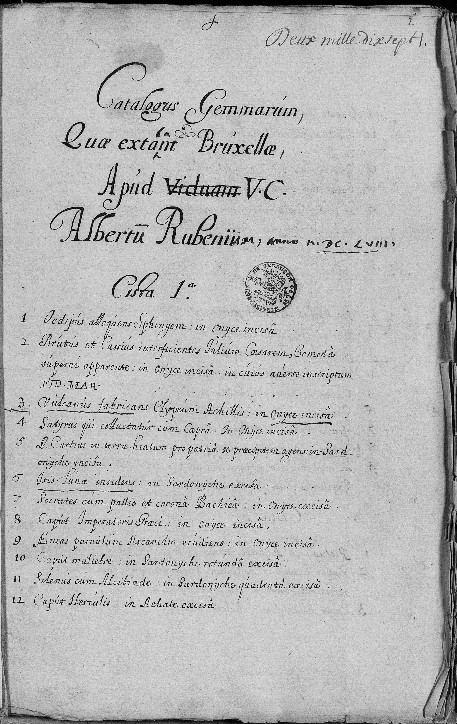
First page of the inventory of the gems in Albert Rubens' estate

At the time of his death, Rubens left a number of writings, some in finished form and others incomplete. A collection of his essays on ancient clothing, coins, and gems was posthumously edited by the German scholar Johann Georg Graevius and published in Antwerp in 1665 by Balthasar Moretus under the title De re vestiaria veterum, [...], et alia eiusdem opuscula posthuma. The volume contained three folded plates and nine engravings, seven of which were based on designs by Peter Paul Rubens and engraved by Cornelis Galle the Younger. The book included Albert Rubens’ essays on the Gemma Augustea and the Gemma Tiberiana, for which he drew on the correspondence between his father and Peiresc for his interpretation of the latter. The work remained highly regarded well into the 18th century. Graevius also incorporated several of Albert's treatises into his own publications, such as the Thesaurus antiquitatum Romanarum (1694–1699, 12 vols.). These included De urbibus Neocoris diatribe, Dissertatio de Nummo Augusti cuius epigraphe: Asia recepta, Dissertatio de Natali die Caesaris Augusti, and Epistolae tres ad Clarissimum virum Gothifredum Wendelinum.

In 1694, Graevius edited and published Rubens’ Dissertatio de Vita Fl. Mallii Theodori, which provides an account of the life of the Roman emperor Theodosius the Great and his sons, along with relevant textual sources. The book was considered an important scholarly work and was reissued in a new edition in 1754 to very positive reception.

An inventory of Rubens’ collection of gems and cameos was drawn up in duplicate by Jean-Jacques Chifflet. One copy is preserved in the Bibliothèque municipale de Besançon. The collection included cameos depicting the goddess Luna and Saint Joseph, as well as a stone related to the Aqua Virgo. His coin collection was comparatively modest and consisted of silver and bronze pieces.

== Publications ==
- De re vestiaria veterum, etc. Antwerp: Officina Plantiniana, 1665. Online edition
- Dissertatio de vita Fl. Mallii Theodori. Utrecht: Willem Broedelet, 1694. Online edition

== See also ==
- Rubens family
