= Waasland =

Historic region in northern Belgium

Coordinates: 51.250°N 4.202°E

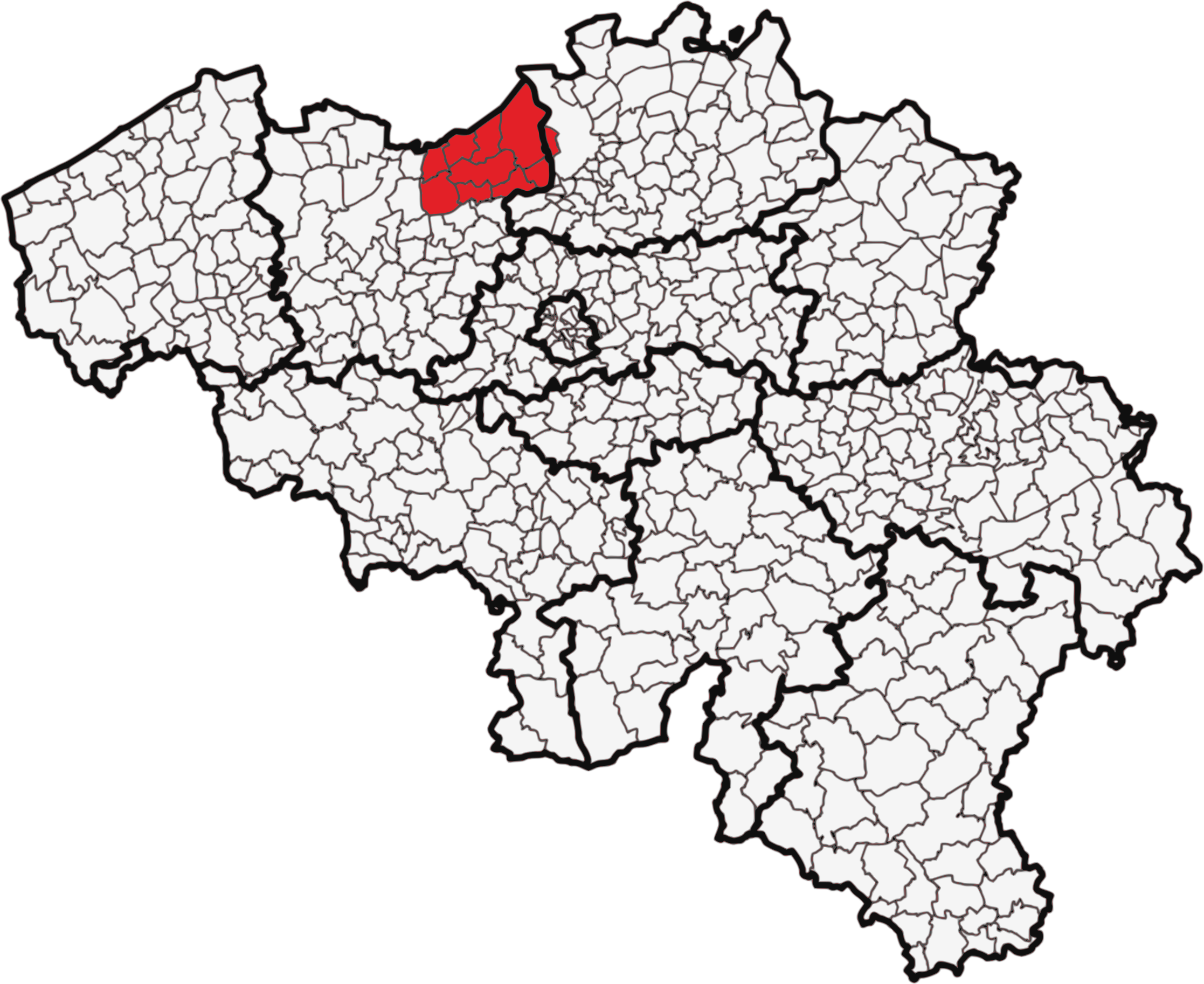
Map showing the Waasland (red) on a map of Belgium

The Waasland (Dutch pronunciation: [ˈʋaːslɑnt], archaically "Waesland") or Land van Waas (Dutch pronunciation: [ˈlɑnt vɑn ˈʋaːs]) is a historic region in northern Belgium. It is part of the Belgian province of East Flanders. The other borders are with the Scheldt and Durme rivers (east and south) and, to the north, the border with the Dutch region of Zeelandic Flanders. The (informal) capital and major city of the region is Sint-Niklaas.

Waas most likely refers to the soggy soil of the region although the exact etymology is unknown. One possibility is a connection to the English word "wasteland". The swamps that characterized it have long been drained although many fields are still noticeably convex; the result of many years of plowing the topsoil towards the center to improve drainage.

Historically, on account of its waterlogged, poor soils the region was thinly populated in comparison to the rest of Belgium and agriculture was by necessity based on holder farms using innovative techniques not usually applied elsewhere even if the farmers had ready markets nearby in the cities of Ghent and Antwerp. Charles Townshend (1674–1748), one of the proponents of the early British Agricultural Revolution, was an explicit advocate of agricultural practices first developed here in Belgium, such as the use of turnips in crop rotation, and the region for some time attracted study trips by early agriculturists in his wake.

The epic tale of Reynard the Fox is set in the region.

The surname "Waas" and variants thereof is quite common in Belgium and refers to this region.

== Municipalities of the Waasland ==
- Beveren-Kruibeke-Zwijndrecht
- Lokeren
- Sint-Gillis-Waas
- Sint-Niklaas
- Stekene
- Temse
- Waasmunster

== Gallery ==
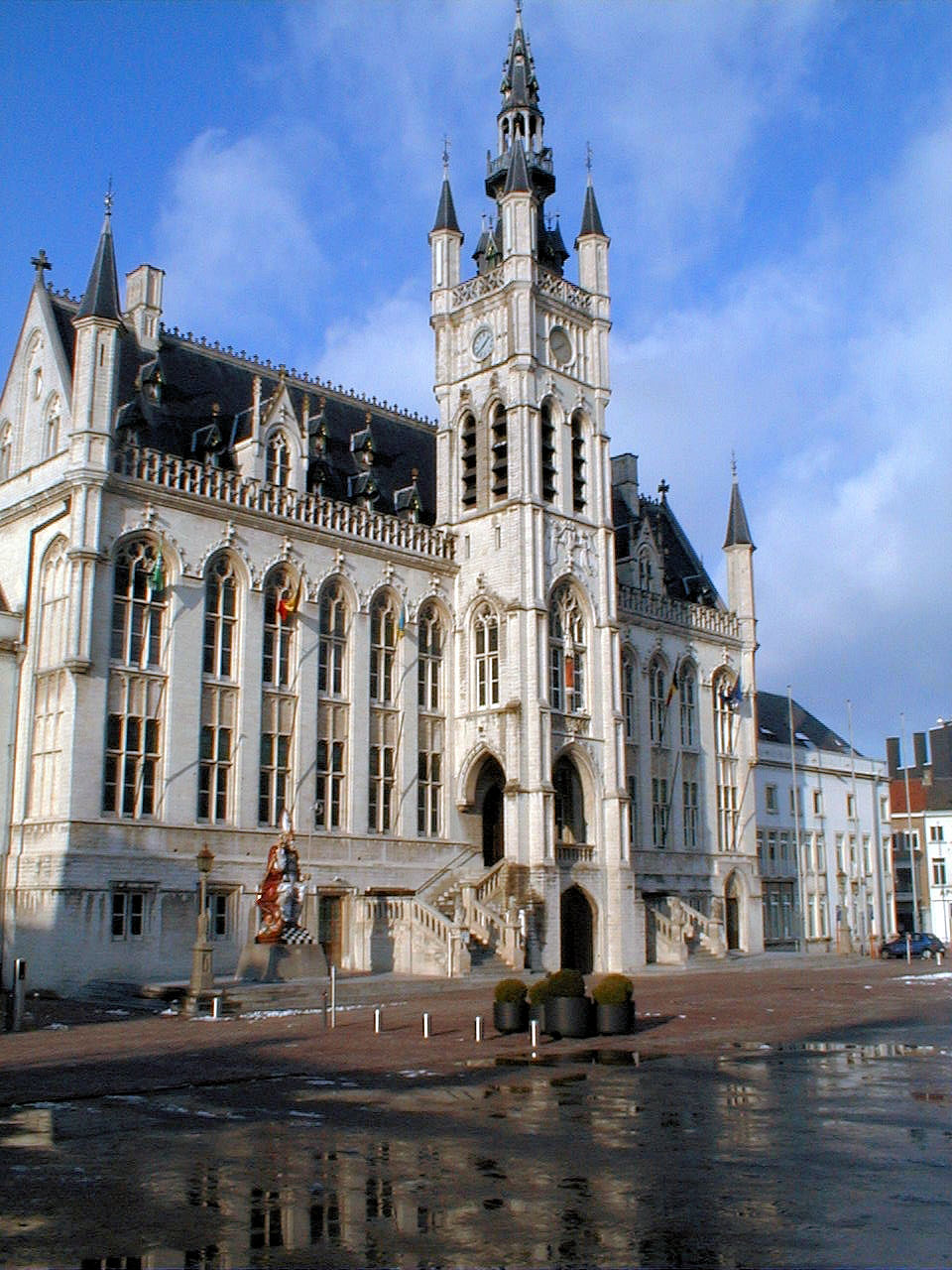
Sint-Niklaas City Hall

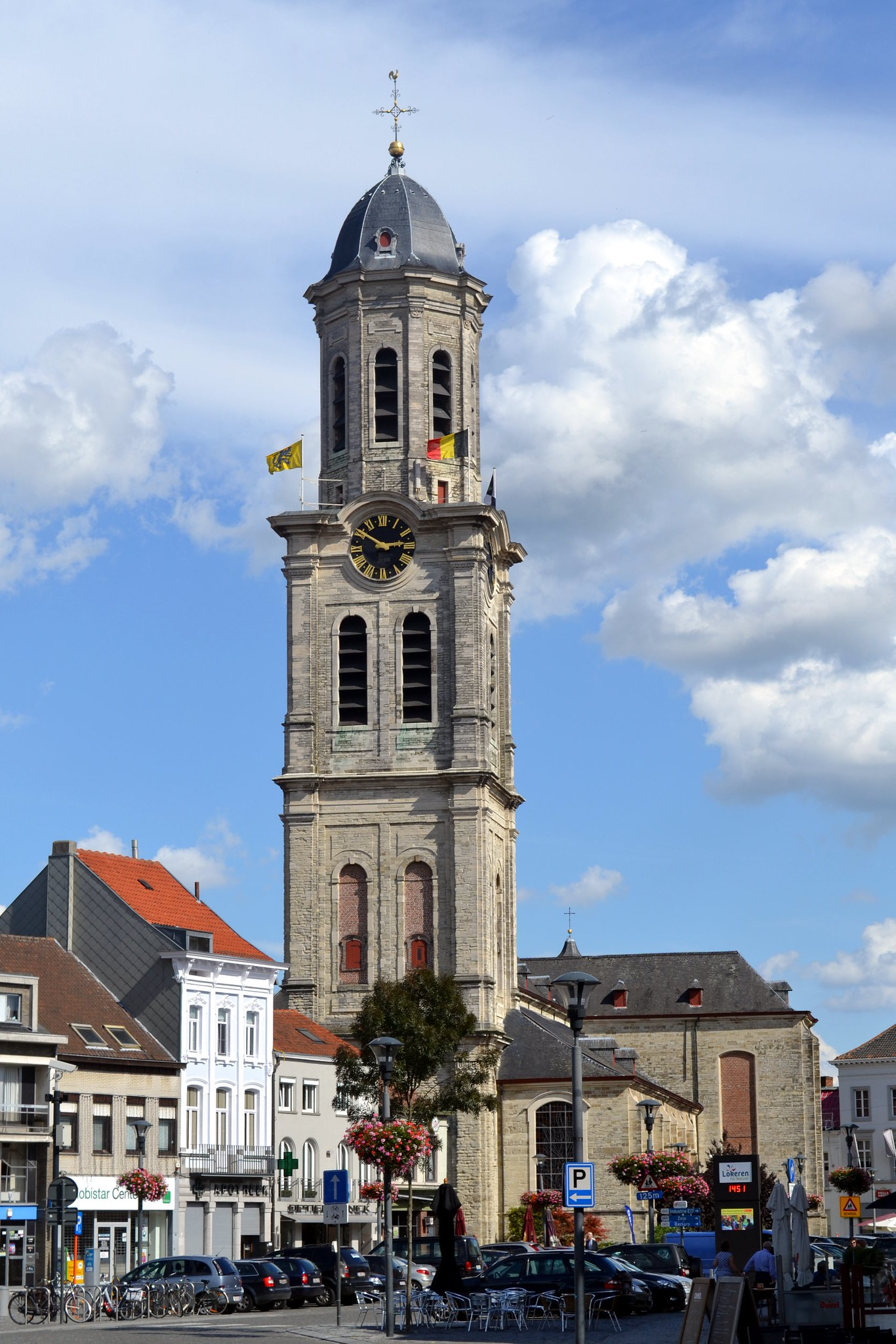
Church of Saint Laurence, Lokeren

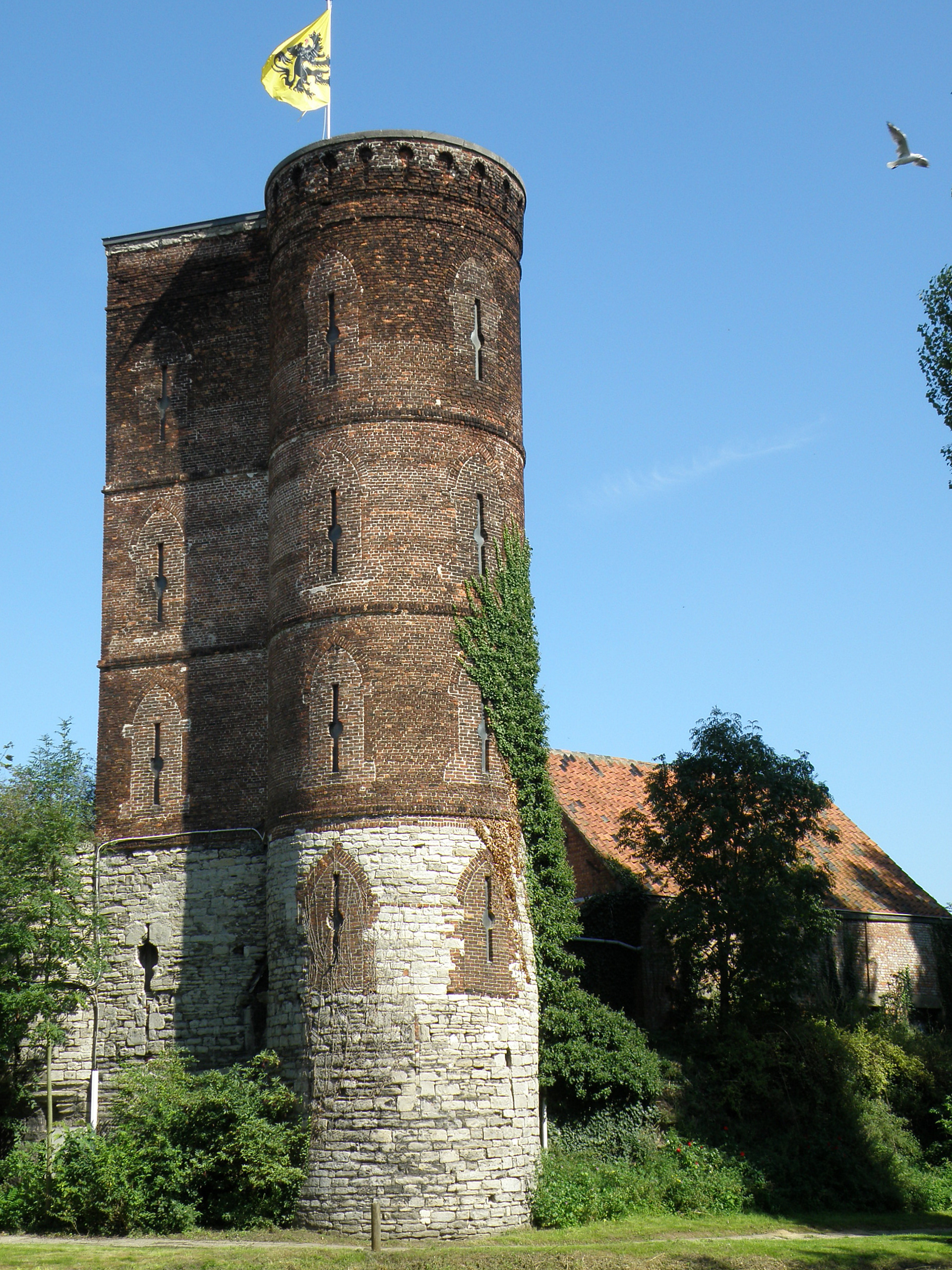
Graventoren, Rupelmonde

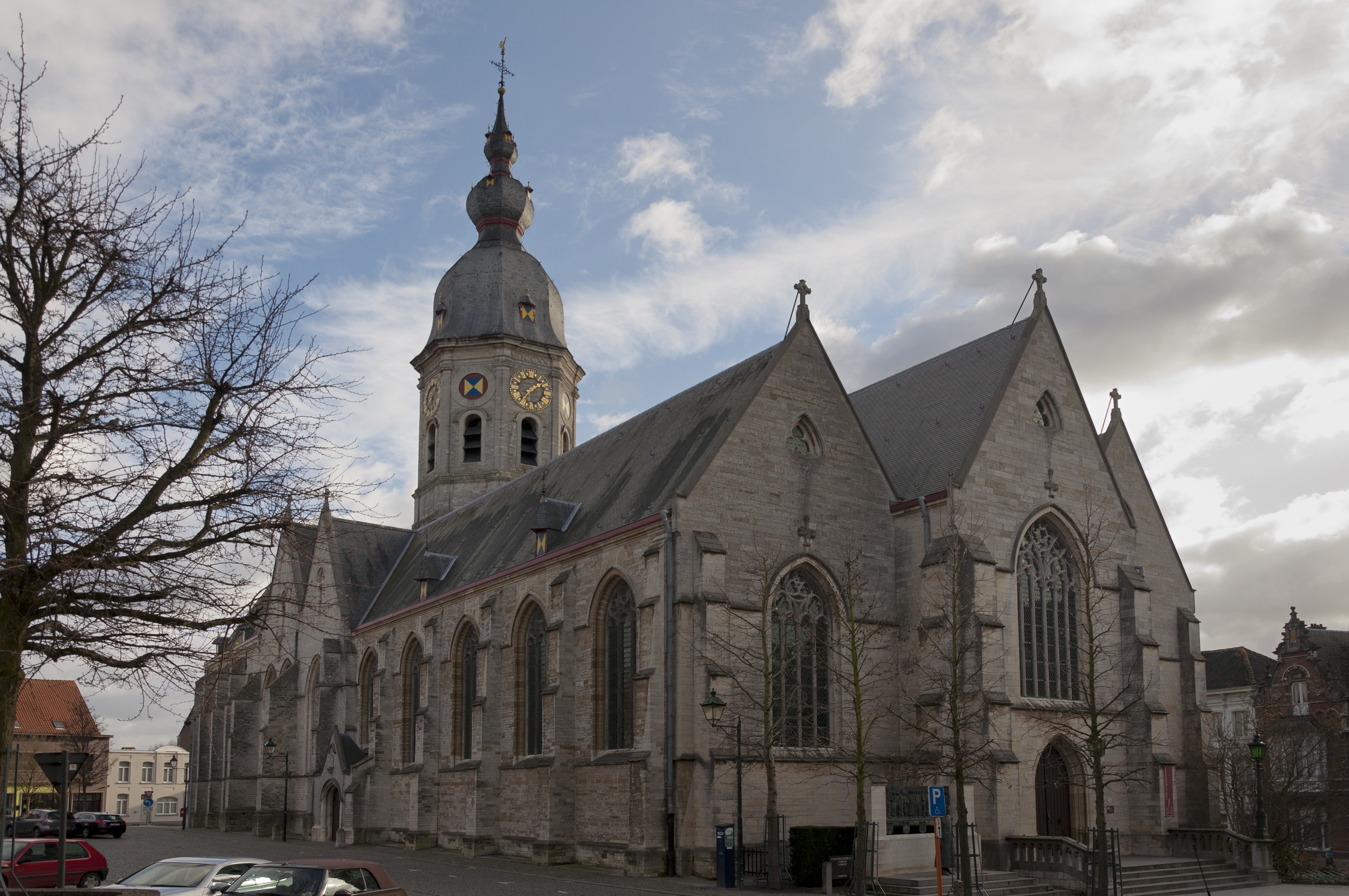
Church of Our Lady, Temse

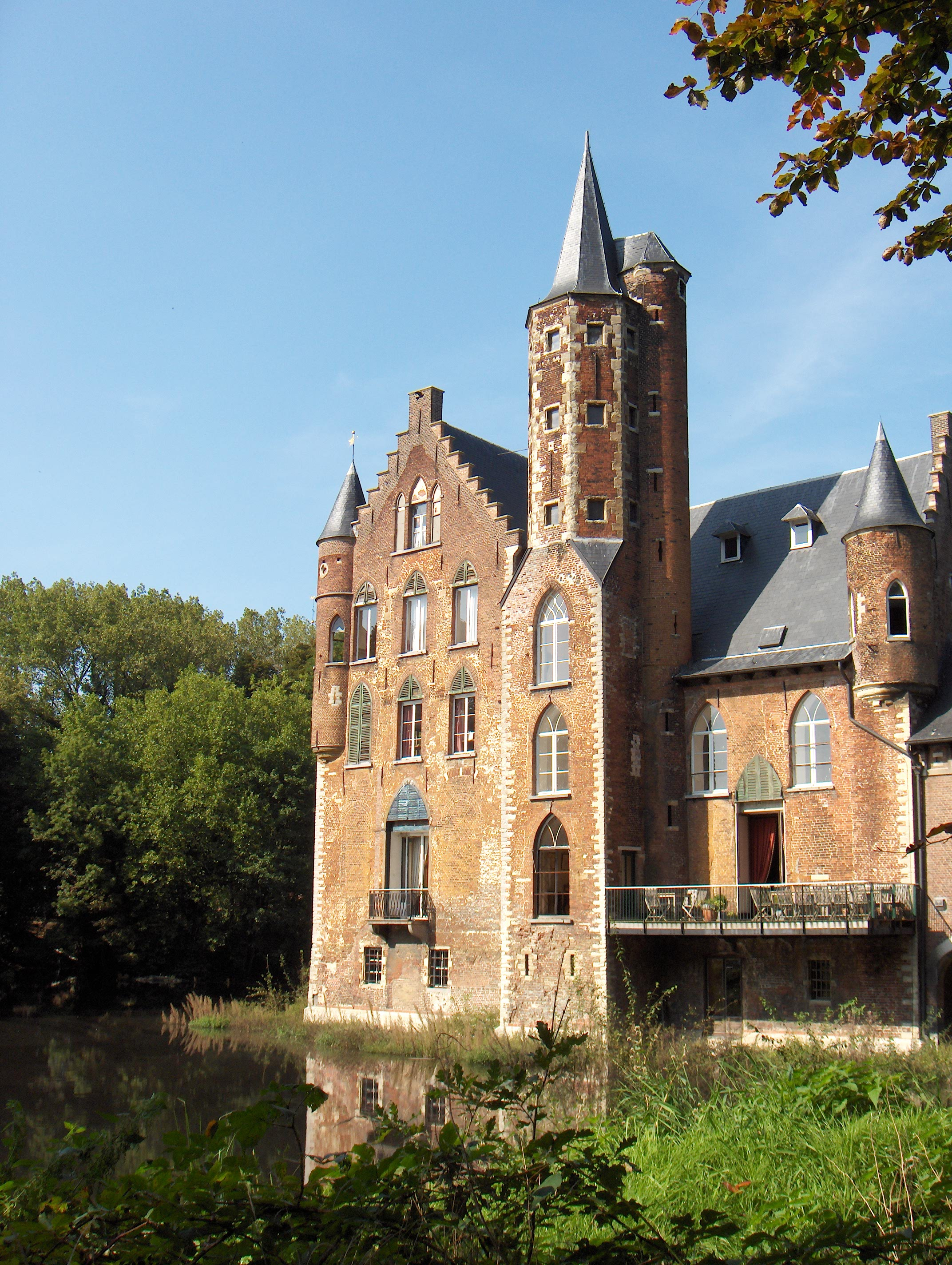
Wissekerke Castle, Bazel

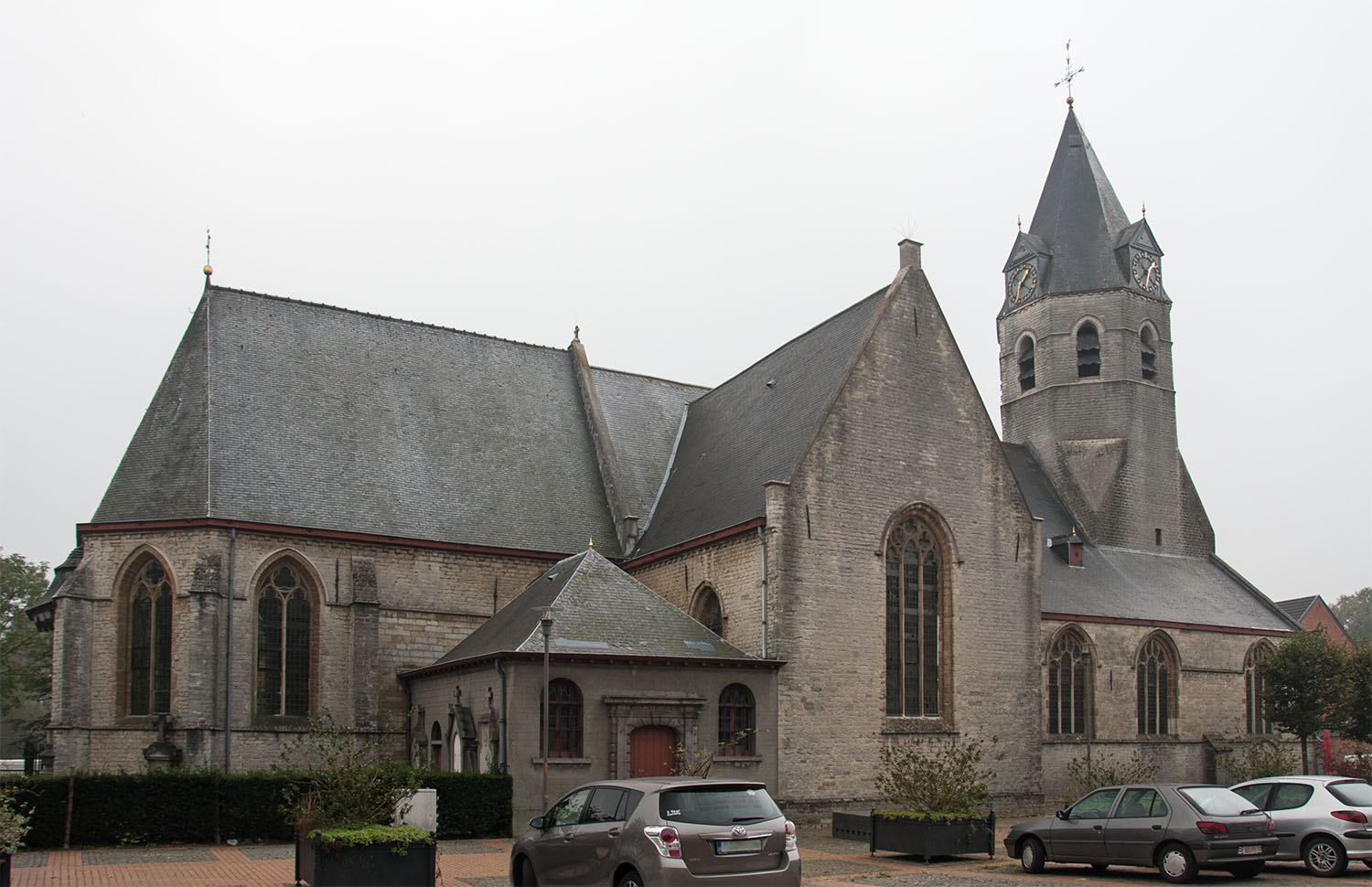
St Andrew and Ghislenus Church, Belsele, Sint-Niklaas

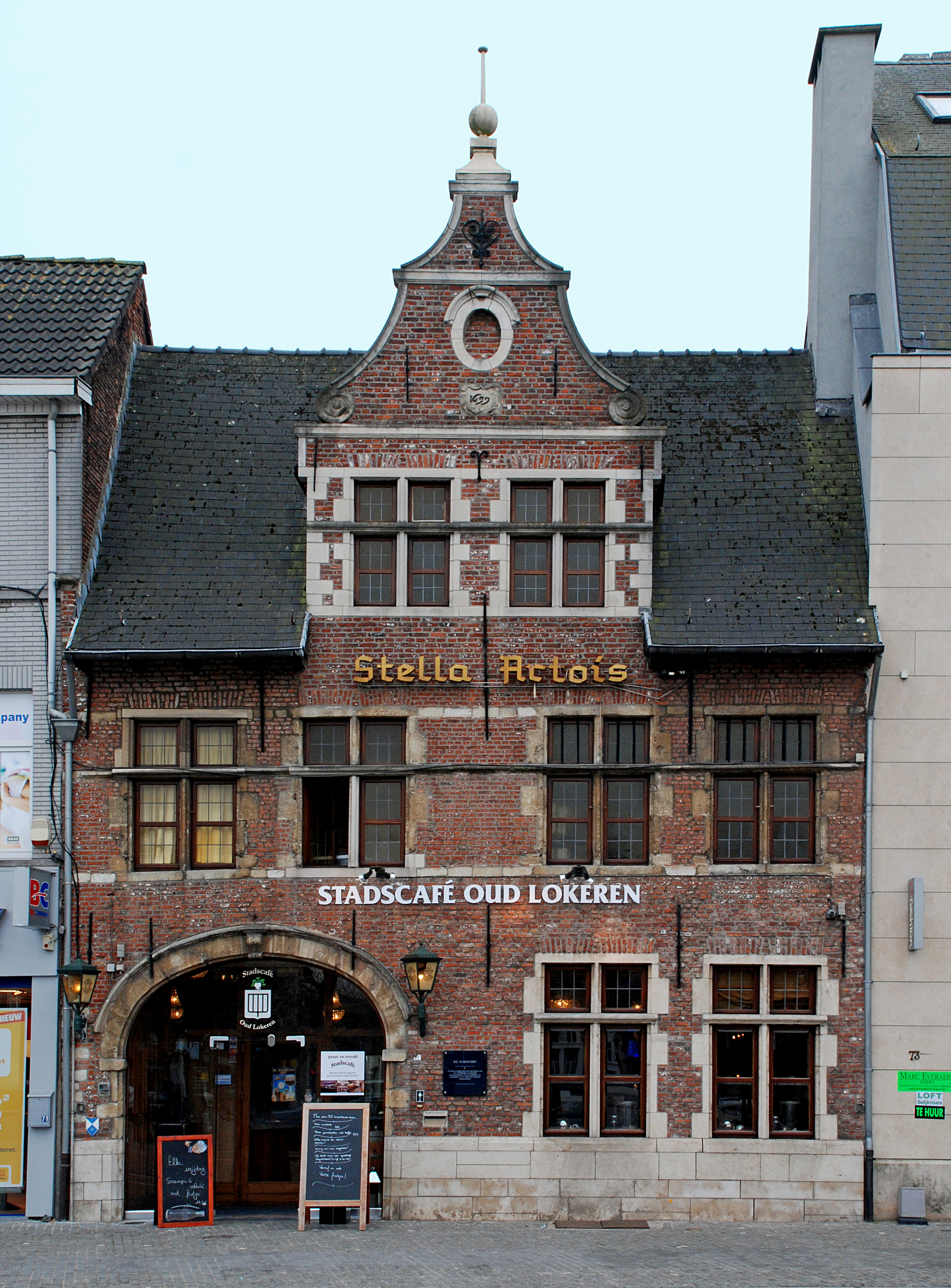
Baroque palace in Lokeren

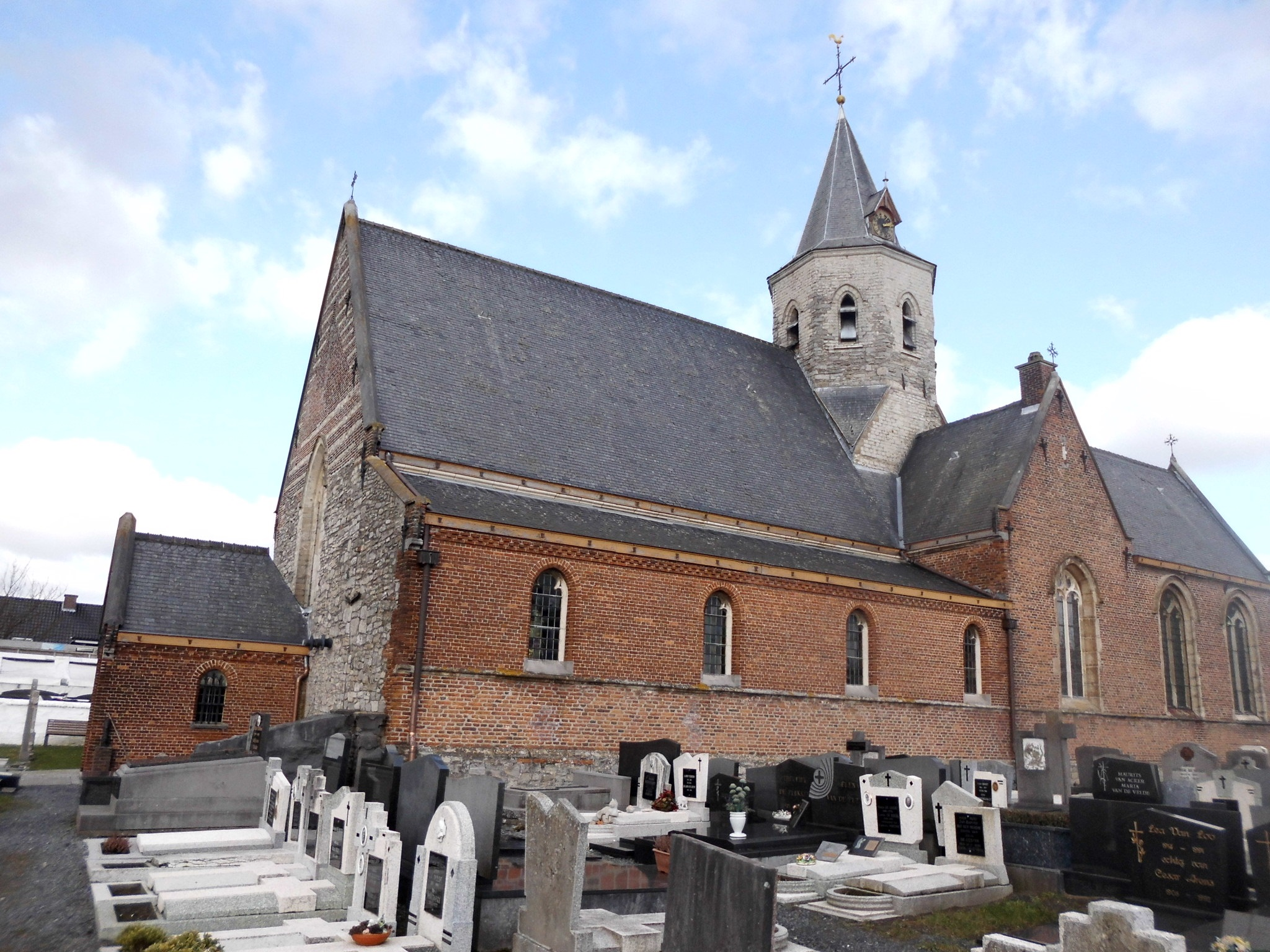
Church of Our Lady, Daknam, Lokeren

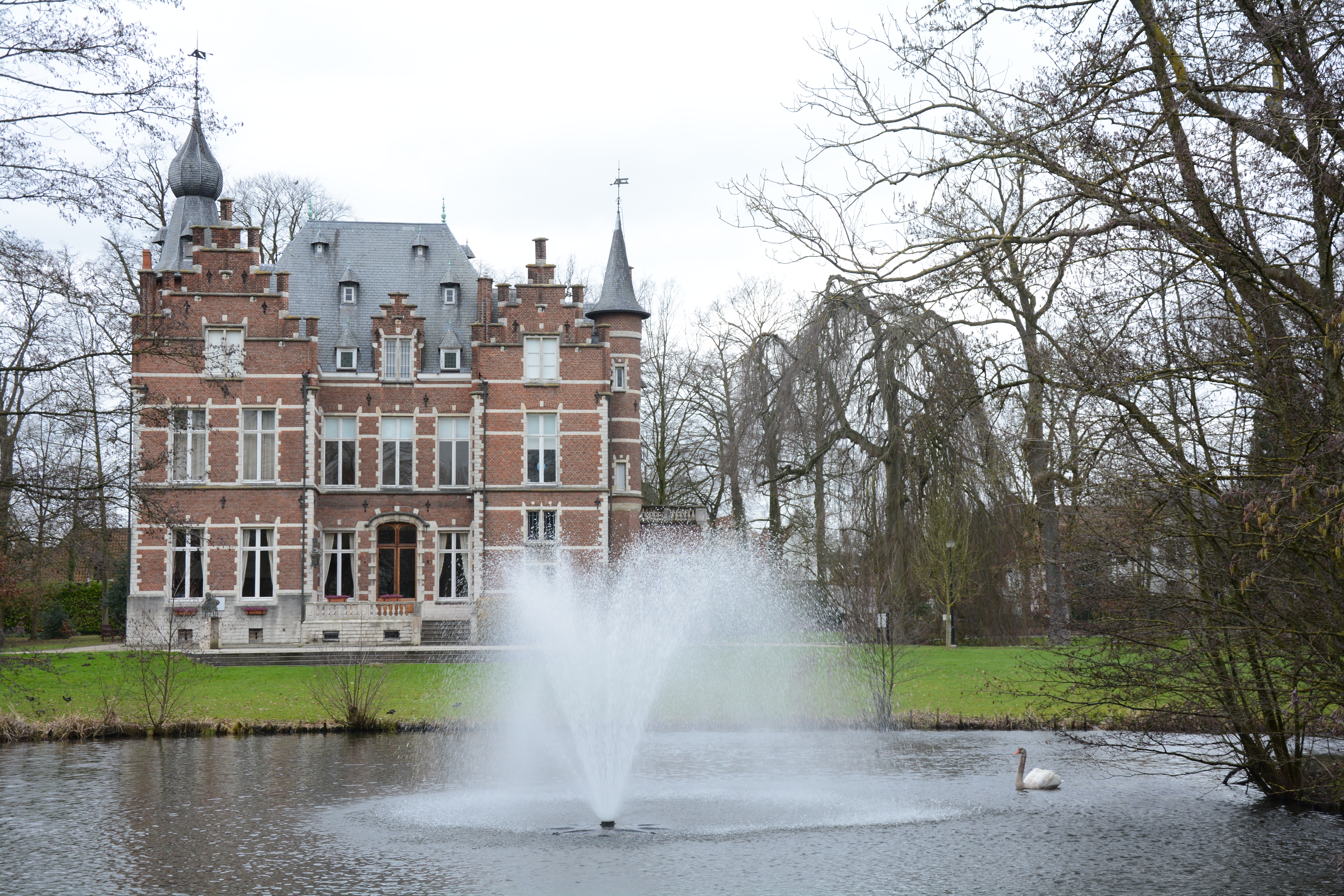
Blauwendael Castle, Waasmunster

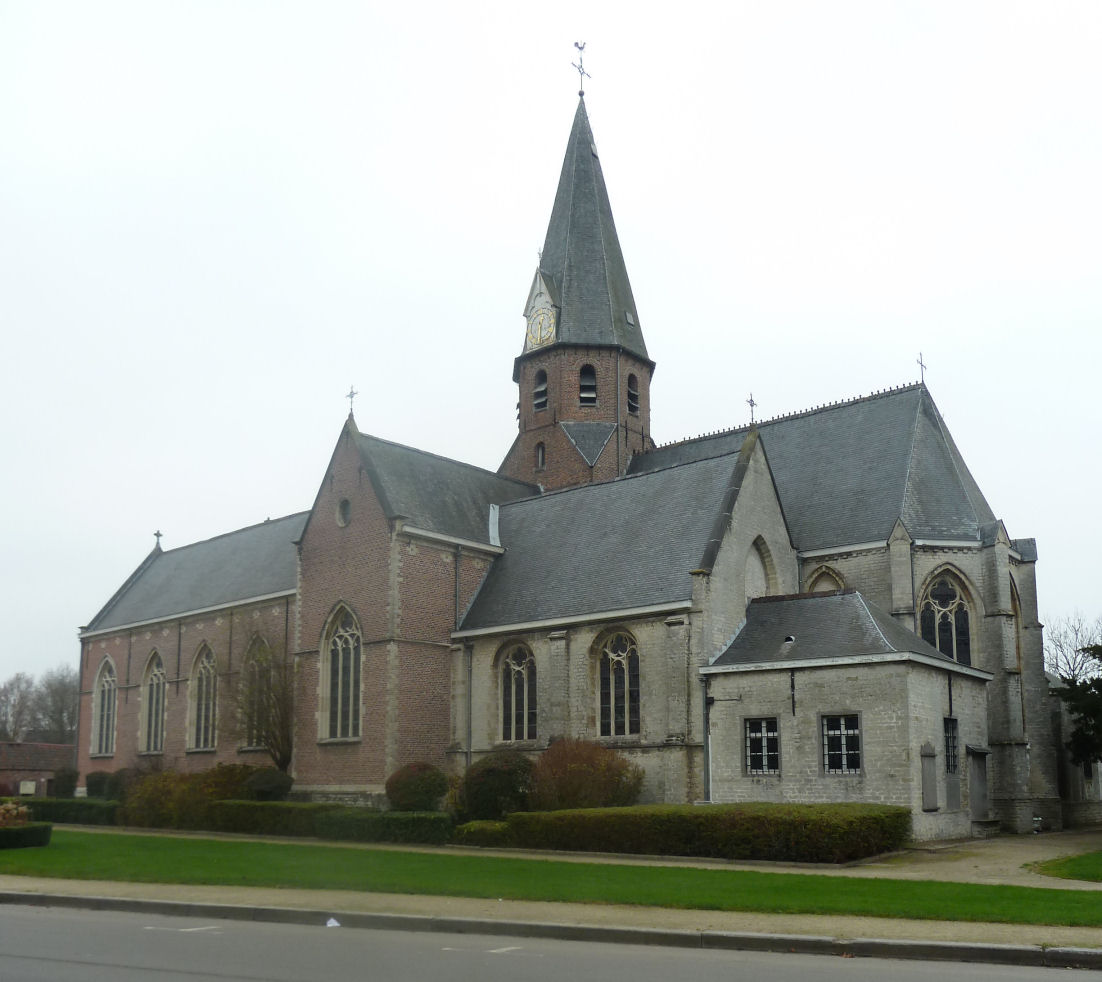
Church of Our Lady of the Ascension, Eksaarde, Lokeren

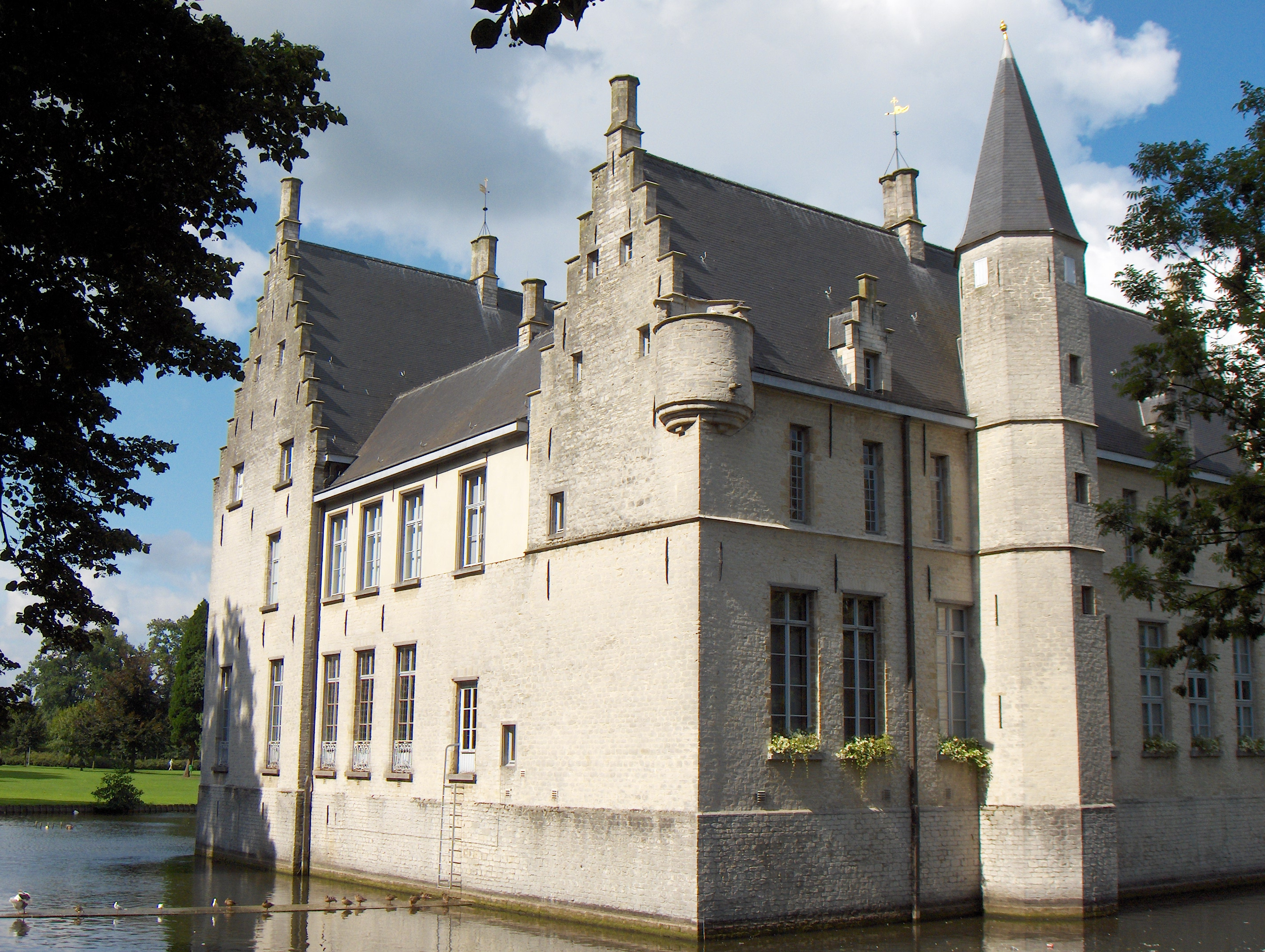
Cortewalle Castle

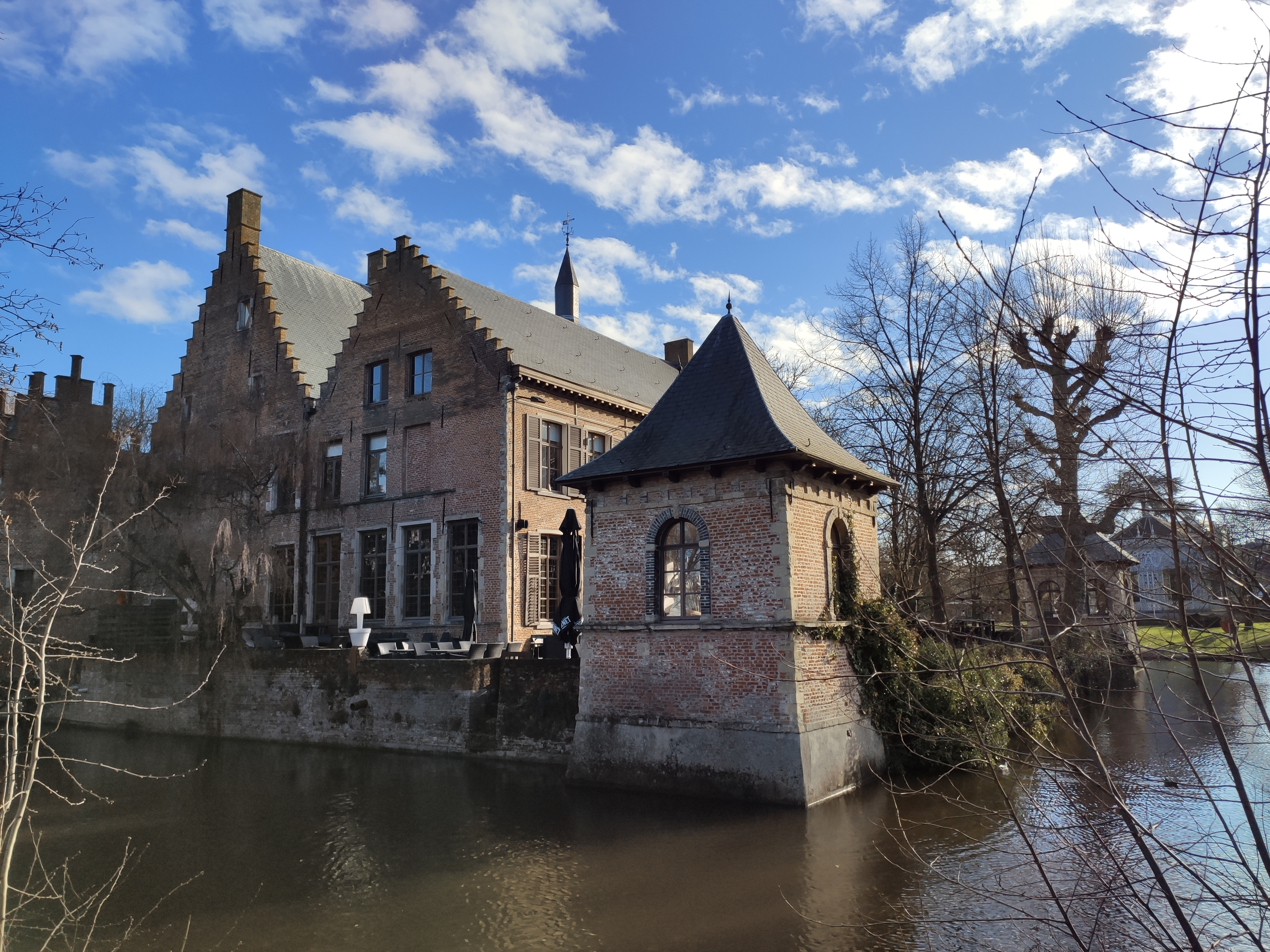
Walburg Castle, Sint-Niklaas

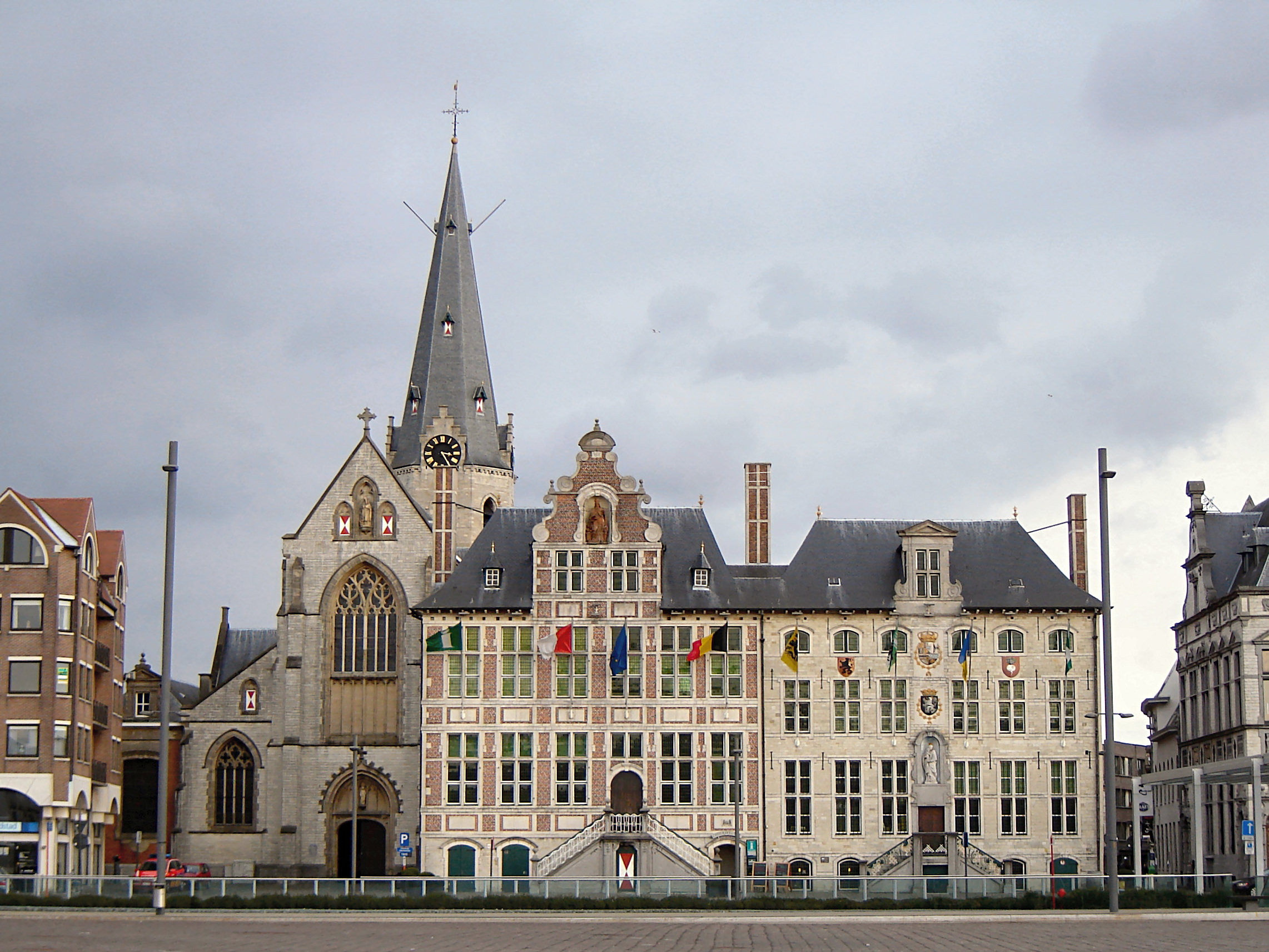
Sint-Nicolaaskerk, with the Parochiehuis and the Cipierage, seen from the Grote Markt
