= Kasteel Cortewalle =

Castle in Belgium

Cortewalle Castle
- Belgium
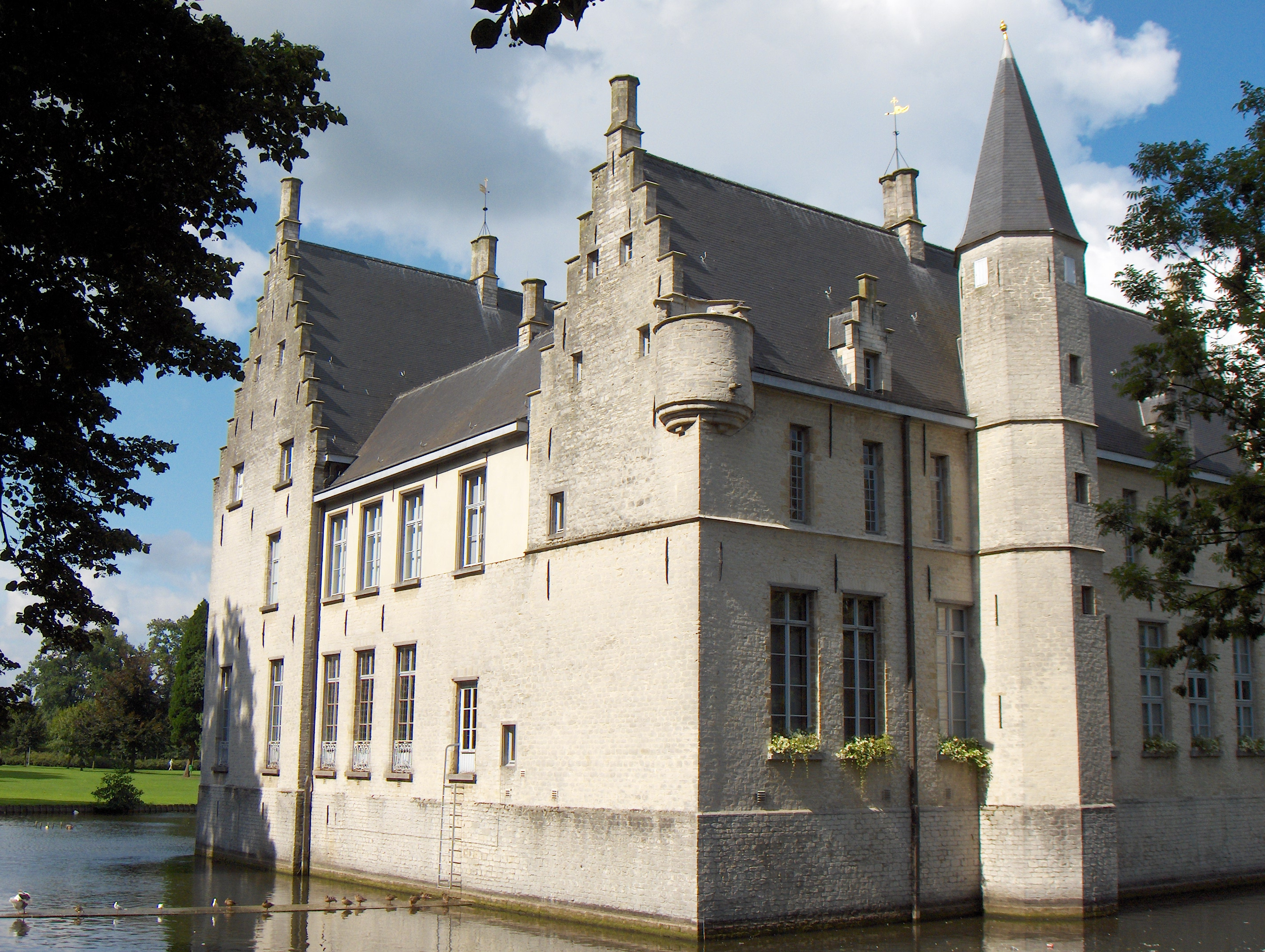

Location
- Coordinates: 51.2138°N 4.2650°E

Site history
- Built: 15th century
- Materials: White sandstone

Cortewalle Castle (Dutch: Kasteel Cortewalle) is a moated castle in Beveren in East Flanders, Belgium.

== History ==
The location was called Ten Wallen, which became in French Cour-ten Walle, hence the name Cortewalle. The castle dates back to the 15th century, and is one of the oldest in the Waasland. It is built of white sandstone, in Flemish Renaissance style. Until the 17th century it was in the possession successively of the house of Triest. It was sold in 1671 to Joannes Francis Goubau and passed to their heirs the family de Brouchoven de Bergeyck. The house of Brouchovens sold it to the municipality of Beveren, who use it for the storage of the extensive and important De Bergeyck archives.

== See also ==
- List of castles in Belgium

== Sources ==
- Information from the municipality website (in Dutch)
