= Rubens family =

Flemish noble family

House of Rubens
- noble family
- Country: Spanish Netherlands
- Founded: Peter Paul Rubens
- Titles: Lords of Vremdyck; Lords of Rameyen

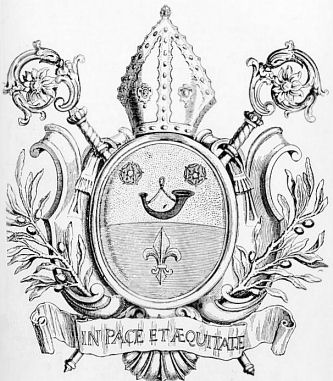
Crest of Gerardus Rubens, Abbot Ocist

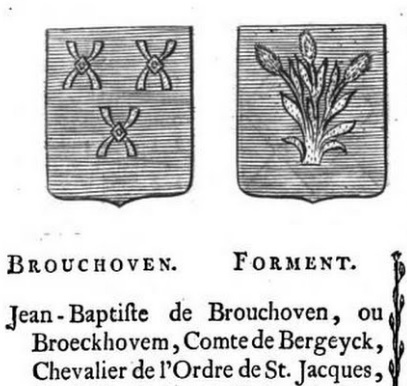
Helena Fourment and the Count of Brouchoven

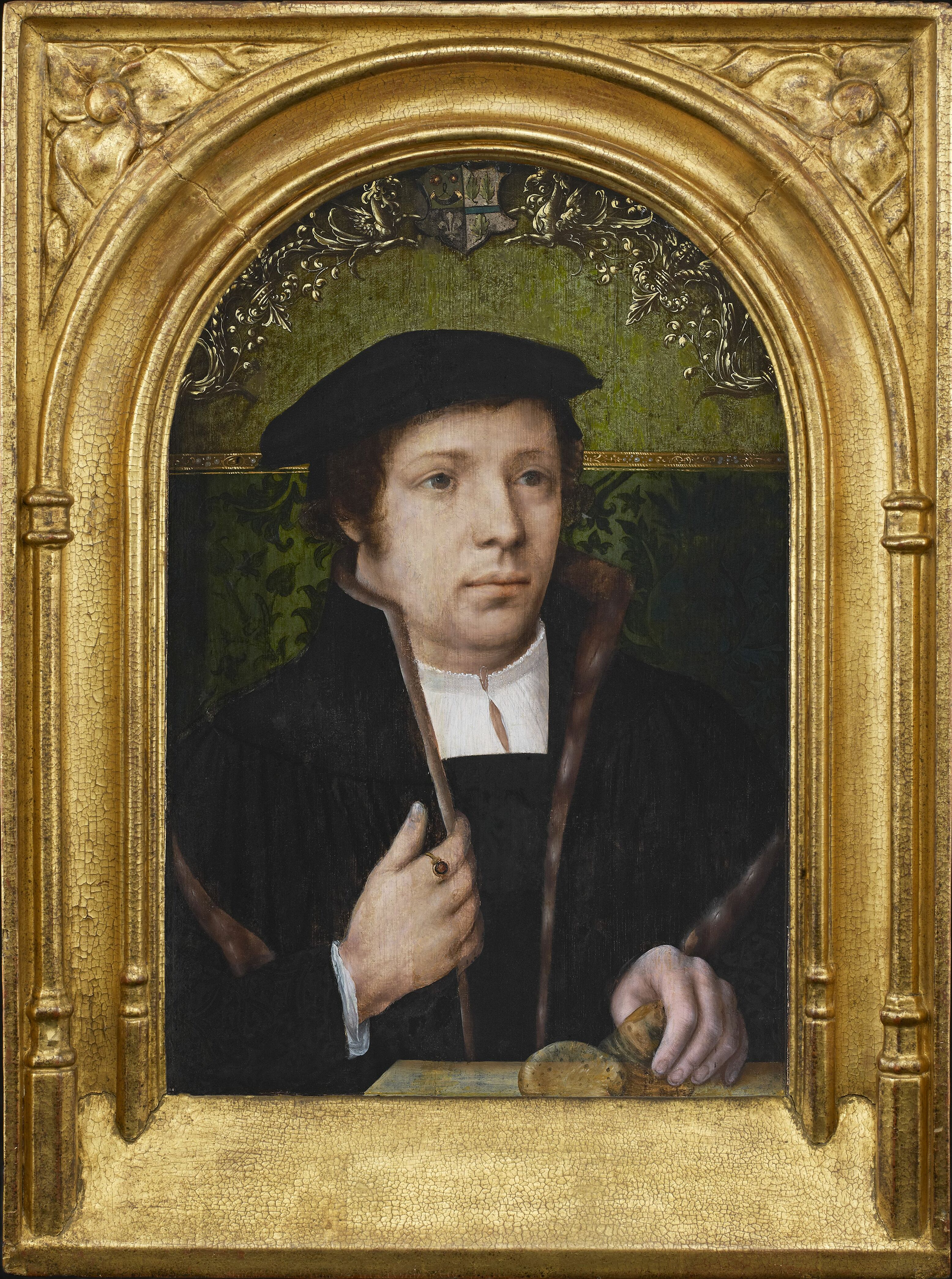
Bartholomeus Rubens

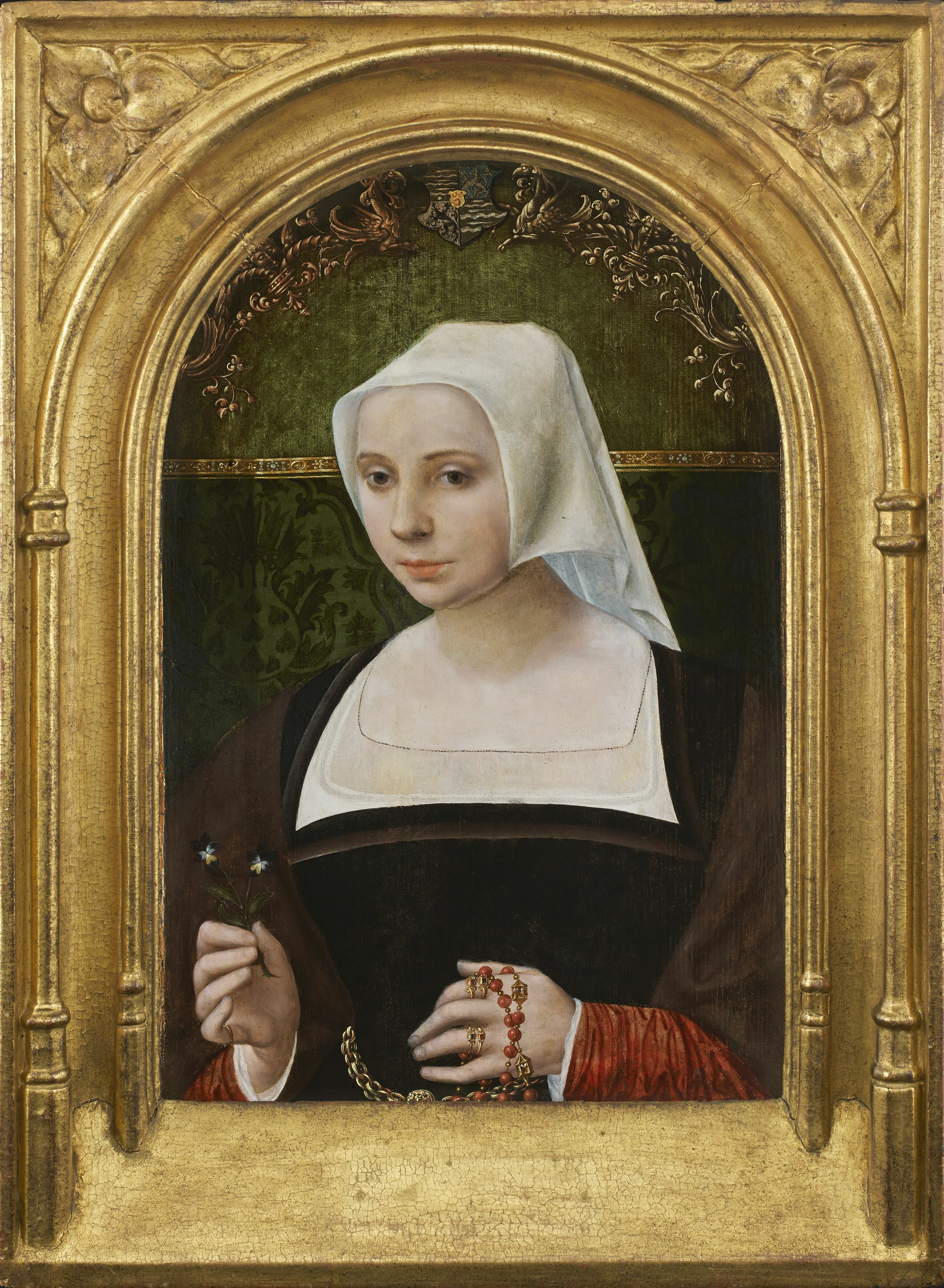
Barbara Arents

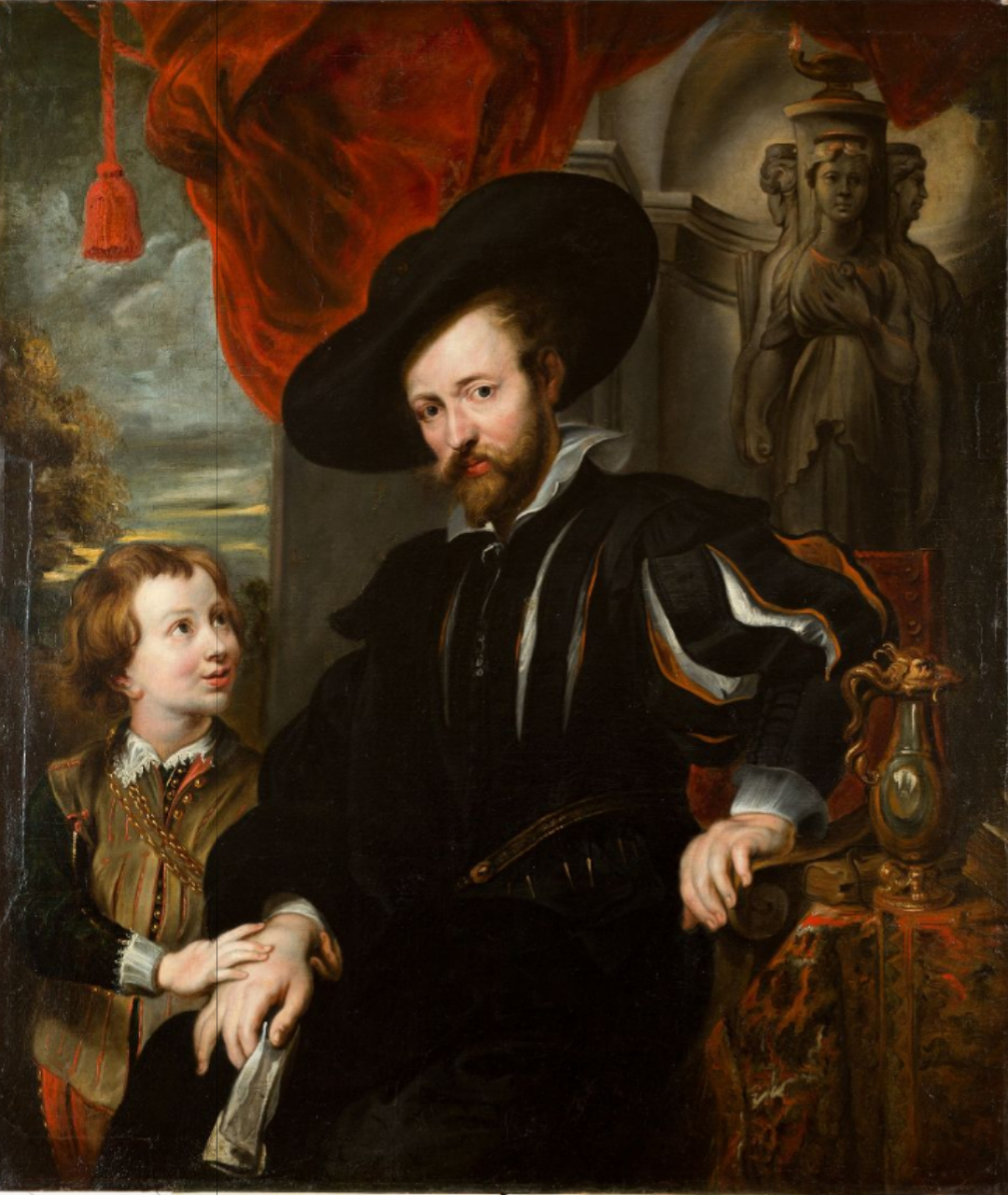
Rubens and his son Albert (1614–1657)

The Rubens family is a Flemish noble family that lived in Antwerp.

== Origin ==
The origin is believed to be Arnold (Arnoldus) Rubbens, a tanner, who was born around 1350, who lived in Antwerp and was married to Catherina van den Elshoute. Their son Jan married Margaretha van Catschote, and was the father of three sons: Arnold II, Joost and Peter I. Bartholomaeus I Rubens, born 1501, is recorded as being at the court of Holy Roman Emperor Charles V. He married Barbara Arents, of noble birth.

Most famous are his grandsons, the painter Sir Peter Paul Rubens (knighted in 1624 by Philip IV of Spain and in 1630 by Charles I of England), and his brother Philip Rubens, who entered in the service of Cardinal Ascanio Colonna. Many of their descendants married to important noble families. The main family members were buried in Antwerp in respectively the Saint James' church, Antwerp and the former St. Michael's Abbey.

Today the family is extinct in the male line, but has descendants in the other branches: Goubau-Rubens / van Parys-Rubens / de Lunden-Rubens. It is believed that there are more than 10,000 descendants today, most of them members of the Belgian aristocracy. The last direct male-line descendant of the painter was his grandson Alexander Rubens, Lord of Vremdyck, who died in Mechelen.

== Genealogy ==
- Peter I Rubbens, son of Arnold II died 1527. Marr. Marghareta van Looveren.
  - Peter Ruebens
  - Constant Ruebens
  - Magdalena Ruebens, marr. Raphael Moninx
  - Maria Ruebens
  - Bartholomaeus I Rubens (1501–) had a pharmacy: marr. 1530 Barbara Arents, called Spierinck .
    - Jan Rubens (1530–1587): doct. Iuris: studied canon law in the Sapienza University of Rome, 1562 Alderman of Antwerp: marr. 1561 Maria Pypelinckx, daughter of Hendrik.
      - Philip I Rubens (1574–1611): secretary to Cardinal Ascanio Colonna. Marr. in 1609 to Maria de Moy, daughter of Hendrik de Moy and Clara of Gülick.
        - Clara II Rubens (1610–1678): marr. Gregory de Weerdt.
        - Philip II Rubens (1611–1678): Secretary of Antwerp. Dies without heirs.
      - Jan II Baptist Rubens (1562–1600)
      - Blandina Rubens (1564–1606): marr. Simon du Parcq, buried in Écaussinnes.
      - Clara I Rubens (1565–1580)
      - Hendrik Rubens (1567–1583)
      - Peter II Paul Rubens (1577–1640): painter to the Archdukes Albert and Isabella, knighted in 1624/1630. Marr. 1st Isabella Brant, 2nd Helena Fourment.
        - 1/ Clara III Serena Rubens
        - 1/ Albert I Rubens (1614–1657): marr. Clara del Monte. Secretary to the Privy Council.
          - Albert II Rubens, died 13 years.
          - Isabella Helena Rubens: marr. Marc van der Vekene, Lord of Berent.
          - Constantia Maria Rubens: marr. Mattheu of Beughem, Lord of Ottignies.
            - Clara Philippa de Beughem (1665–1722): marr. Alexander of Hannoset (1658–1740)
            - Catharine Francisca de Beughem (1673–1718)
            - Hyacinthe Joseph de Beughem (1675–1735): Lord of Ottignies. marr. Maria Lucia de Villegas.
          - Clara V Petronilla Rubens: marr. don Juan Guillermo, viscount of Alvarado y Bracamonte (1643–1735): alderman of Brussels, Lord of Melis and Opberghen.
            - don Andres Joseph, Viscount of Alvarado y Bracamonte.
            - don Joannes Philipp Constant, Viscount of Alvarado y Bracamonte.
            - don Alexander Guillaume, Viscount of Alvarado y Bracamonte.
            - doña Catherine Josepha, Viscountes of Alvarado y Bracamonte: Marr. Charles Claude François de Blondel d’Oudenhove
        - 1/ Nicolaas Peter Paulus Rubens (1618–1655): marr. Constancia Helman, daughter of Ferdinand, alderman of Antwerp.
          - Albert III Marie Rubens (1642–1672), Lord of Ramaye: alderman of Antwerp. married Catharina Vecquemans.
            - Maria Catharina Rubens (1672–1710): married to Alexander IV Goubau, Lord of Mespelaere (1658–1712): Grand Almoner of Antwerp.
              - Georges Alexander Goubau, Lord of Mespelaer (1697–1760): marr. Maria Bosschaert.
          - Philippe III Rubens: Alderman of Antwerp, Mayor of Antwerp in 1691.
          - Jan II Nicolaas Rubens: marr. Constante Cornelie Helman, daughter of the Lord of Waesbeeke.
            - Cornelia Paulina Philippine Rubens (1677–1738): marr, to Honore Henri, Count of Esbeke, Vicomte de Haeghen, lord of Riviere d'Arschot (1659–1739).
              - Nicolas Clement Honore van der Hagen, died 1729.
              - Constantia Honorine Theresia van der Hagen, Countess d'Esbeke, marr. Ferdinand philippe de Vischer, Baron of Celles: Lord mayor of Brussels.
          - Helene Francoise Rubens: marr. John Baptist Lunden.
          - Constantia Maria Rubens: marr. Lambert Frederick of Bronchorst (died 1717), Lord of Ballaere.
        - 2/ Clara IV Joanna Rubens, lady of Merksem, died 1689: marr. Philip van Parys, Lord of Merxem, buried in Saint-Jacobs.
          - Jacques-Ignace van Parys, Canon in Ghent Catedral.
          - Jean Baptiste van Parys, Lord of Vremdyck marr. Isabella Philippine vander Brugghen, daughter of Conrad.
          - Jean François van Parys,
          - Philippe Constant van Parys, died 1729: Marr. Catharine Françoise Rubens, Daughter of François I Rubens, marr. Suzanne Charles.
            - Alexandre Jacques van Parys
            - Jean-Baptiste Philippe van Parys
            - Isabella Alexandrina van Parys: marr. Francois Frederic, count di Respani, Lord of Vremdyck, died 1759.
              - Alexandre Joseph de Rispani, Count Respani, Lord of Vremdyck, marr. Maria Josephine de Ryckel.
              - Catherine Hyacinthe de Rispani.
        - 2/ François I Rubens : alderman of Antwerp in 1659, marr. Suzanne Charles.
          - François II Rubens, marr. Barbe Francisca de Claer
            - François III Maria Rubens, died 1720: canon of Ghent Cathedral.
          - Alexander Joseph Rubens, Lord of Vremdyck, marr. Catharine van Parys, daughter of Jan Baptist, Lord of Vremdyck.
          - Catharine Françoise Rubens, died 1717, marr. Philip Constant van Parys, son of Clara IV Joanna Rubens and Philippe of Parys, lord of Mercksem
        - 2/ Isabella Helena Rubens (1635–1652)
        - 2/ Peter III Paul Rubens (1642–1672): priest.
        - 2/ Constantia Rubens, born 3 February 1641: entered La Cambre Abbey in 1668.
      - Bartholomaeus II Rubens (1581–1581).
        - Aloysius Rubens, married to Anne de Deckers,
          - Gerardus Rubens, 42nd Abbot of the Common Observance in St. Bernard's Abbey, Hemiksem.

== See ==
- Rockox family
- Goubau family
