= Goubau family =

Goubau
- noble family
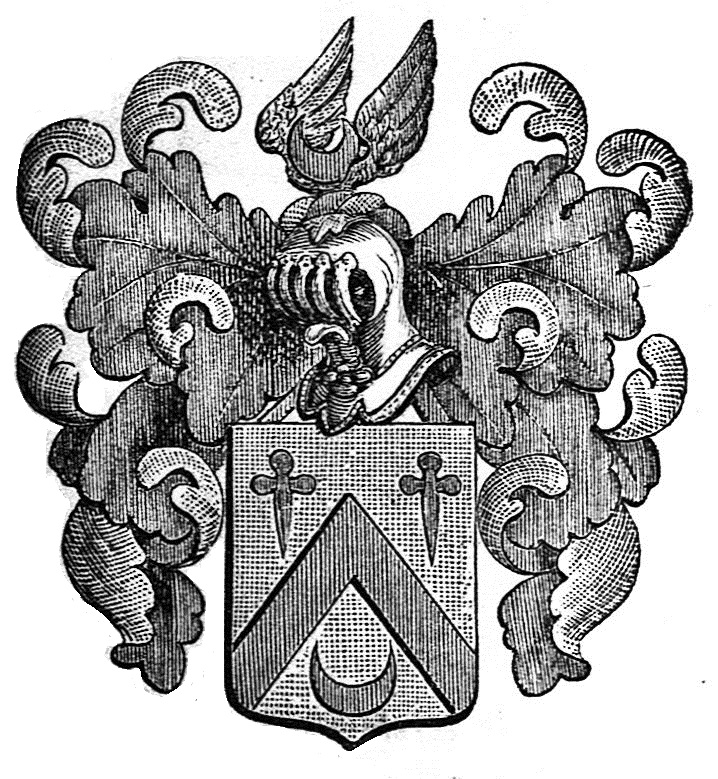
- Country: Spanish Netherlands Austrian Netherlands
- Titles: Lord of Mespelaere; Lord of Triest; Lord of Saint-Fontaine; Lord of Ghysegem
- Estate: Cortewalle Castle
- Cadet branches: Goubau d'Hovorst

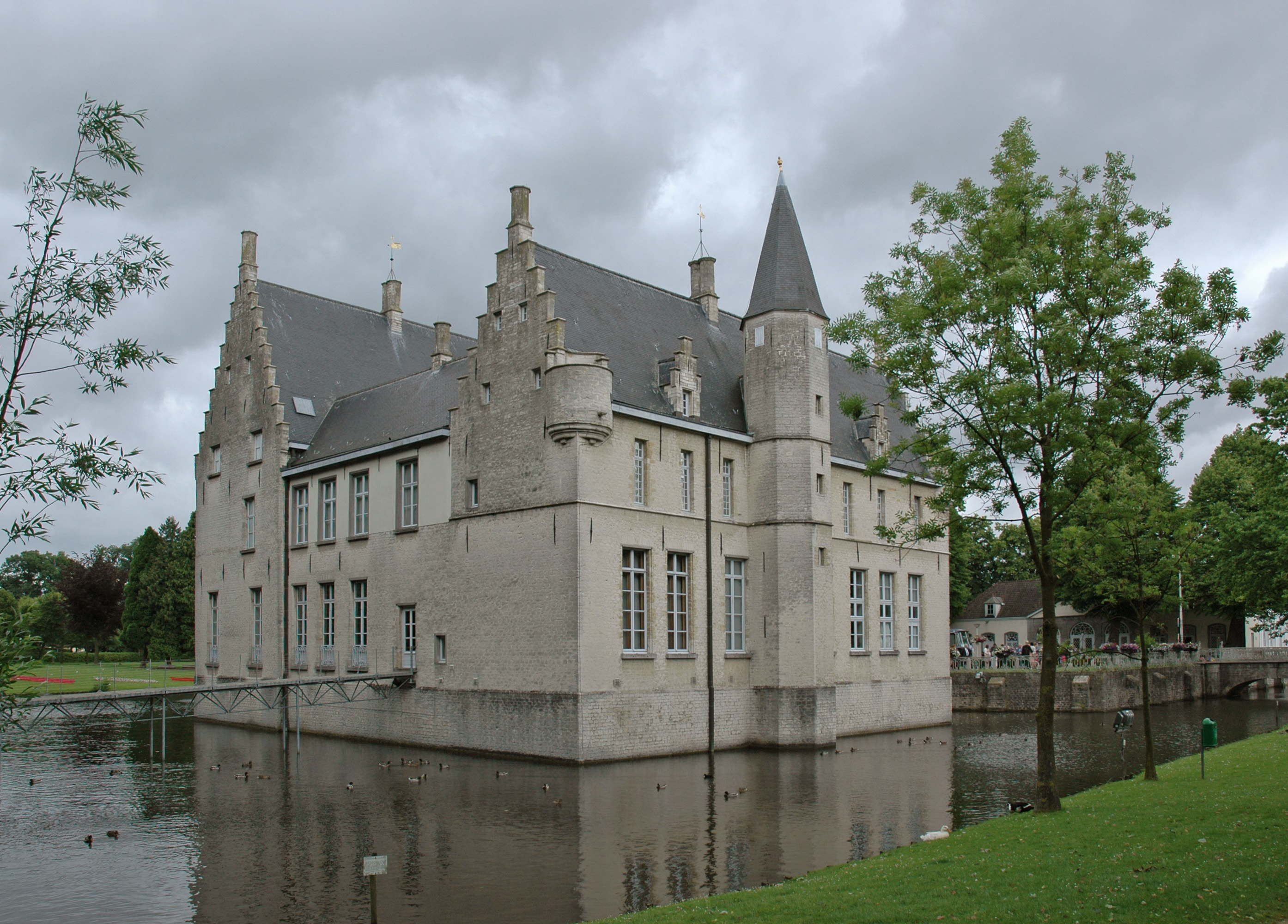
Cortewalle Castle, Beveren.

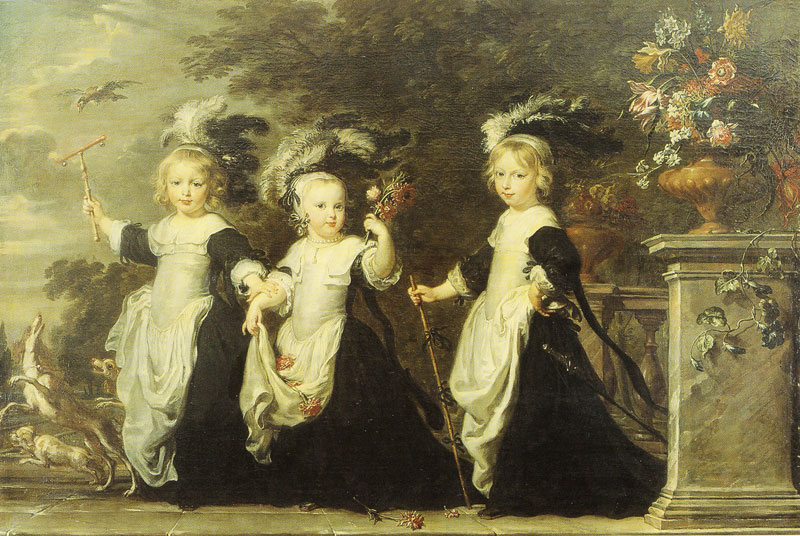
Alexander IV Goubau, and John V Cornelis Goubau as Children, painted by Justus van Egmont in 1663.

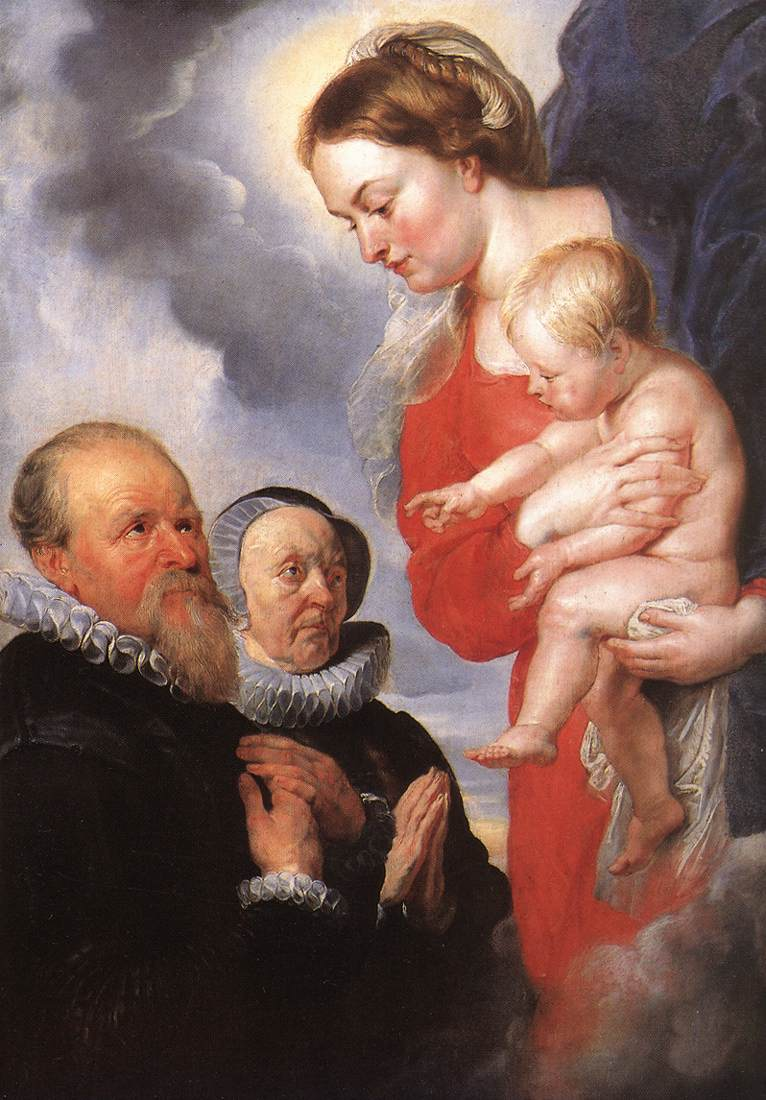
Alexander I Goubau and his wife, painted by Rubens

The Goubau family was an important noble family of Antwerp, many of its members are related to other important families.

In 1633 king Felipe IV of Spain granted nobility. In 1866 the last member of the family died.

The family had many important residences amongst them den Wolsack (1593) in Antwerp and Cortewalle Castle in Beveren. In Mespelare and Dendermonde they did important gift to the local church and founded the so-called Spaans hof in 1643 to Honour Aldegondis van Maubeuge. In Mortsel they resided in Ten Dorpe Castle

== Members ==
1. Henri Goubau, knight of Calatrava.
  1. Joannes I Goubau, Lord of Saint-Fontaine, (1503-1581): marr. Joanne Cossiers in 1534, daughter of Joannes Cossiers or Cosserie and Barbe Schetz.
    1. Joannes II Goubau, marr. Joanna Stayaerts.
    2. Henricus Goubau
    3. Jacobus Goubau, marr. Catharine Maynaert.
    4. Joanna Goubau, died 1575.
    5. Gaspar Goubau
    6. Antonius Goubau
    7. Alexander I Goubau, (1540-1614): Grand Aumonier of Antwerp, buried in the cathedral.
      1. Anna Goubau, (1568-)
      2. Alexander II Goubau (1571-)
      3. Maria Goubau, (1573-)
      4. Joannes III Goubau, Lord of Ghysegem, (1575-1645): Grand Aumonier of Antwerp, Knighted in 1633. Marr. Magd. Vecquemans.
        1. Alexander III Goubau, Lord of Ghysegem, (1598-1668), knighted 1648, Mayor of Antwerp, Grand Aumonier of Antwerp, 1629. marr. Anna Doncker.
          1. Joannes IV Goubau, Lord of Ghysegem, (1630-) : knighted 1655, marr Marie Cornelie crook.
            1. Alexander IV Goubau, Lord of Mespelaere, (1658-1712): Grand Aumonier of Antwerp, Marr. in 1690 Maria Catharina Rubens, granddaughter of Nicolaas Rubens, Lord of Rameyen.
              1. Georges Alexander Goubau, Lord of Mespelaere (1697-1760) : marr. Maria Bosschaert.
            2. Joannes V Cornelis Goubau, (1660-1702), Grand Aumonier of Antwerp in 1689: marr. Susanne van Colen.
        2. François Goubau, Lord of Triest, (1611-1647) : marr. Isabella vanden Broecke.
          1. Joannes VI Frans Goubau, Lord of Triest, (1646-1683), Lord of Beveren, knighted on 10 April 1679 by Charles II: Marr. Margaretha-Catharina Gerardi.
            1. Peter Frans Goubau, (1680-1749): marr. Maria Lucretia Bernaerts.
              1. Charles Henri Goubau, (1708-1776): councillor of the Great Council of Mechelen, marr. Regina de Villegas (1722-1794 .
                1. Melchior Joseph François Ghislain Goubau, (1757-1836): councillor of the Great Council of Mechelen, marr. Marie-Jeanne de Villegas de Pellenberg.
                2. Emmanuel Goubau, (1760-1828), marr. Maria Isabella de Brouchoven de Bergeyck (1773-1819).
                3. Eugène Joseph Goubau, (1761-1831): Lord mayor of the Brugse Vrije.

== Family tree ==
Henri Goubau
Joannes I Goubau (1503-1581)	Joanna Cossiers
Joannes II Goubau	Henricus Goubau	Jacobus Goubau	Joanna Goubau	Gaspar Goubau	Antonius Goubau	Alexander I Goubau
Anna Goubau	Alexander II Goubau	Maria Goubau	Joannes III Goubau	Magdalene Vecquemans
Alexander III Goubau	Anna Doncker	Isabella vanden Broecke	François Goubau
Joannes IV Goubau	Marie Cornelie	Margaretha-Catharina Gerardi	Joannes VI Frans Goubau
Maria Catharina Rubens	Alexander IV Goubau	Joannes V Cornelis Goubau	Maria Lucretia Bernaerts	Peter Frans Goubau
Georges Alexander Goubau	Regina de Villegas	Charles Henri Goubau
Maria Isabella de Brouchoven de Bergeyck	Emmanuel Goubau
