= Valère Gille =

Belgian poet (1867–1950)

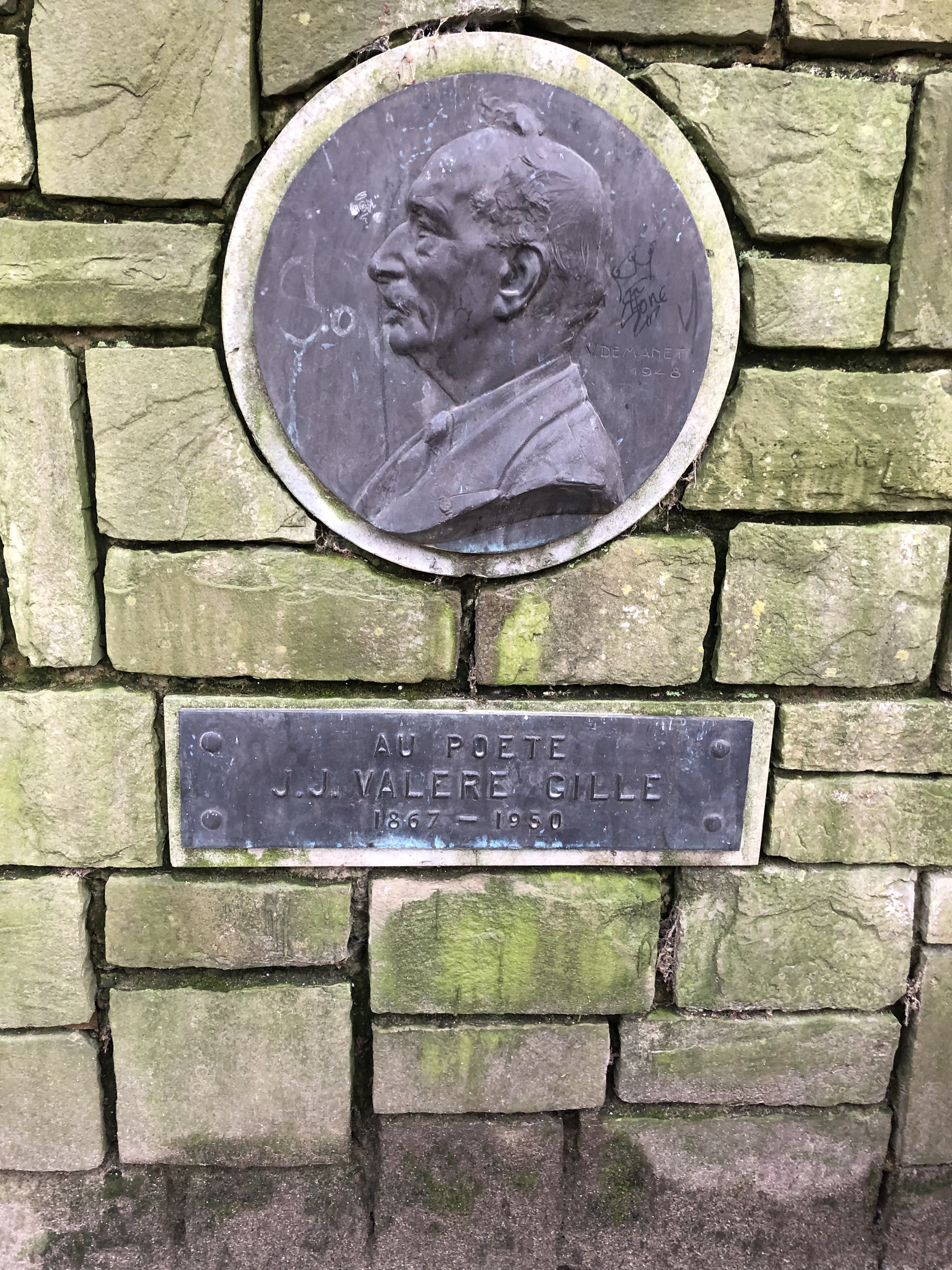
Valère Joseph Jules Gille

Valère Joseph Jules Gille (born Anderlecht, 3 May 1867, died Haasdonk, 1 June 1950) was a Belgian poet.

== Life ==
In 1885 Gille enrolled at the Catholic University of Leuven, and in 1887 he began writing for La Jeune Belgique. In 1889 he, together with Iwan Gilkin and Albert Giraud, took over the running of the periodical. He resigned in 1891 to take up a position at the Royal Library of Belgium. A volume of his poems, La Cithare (Paris, 1897) was lauded by the Académie française.

On 8 January 1921 he was appointed to the Académie royale de langue et de littérature françaises de Belgique, becoming its director 1925–1946. In 1945 he became curator of the Wiertz Museum.

He died in Haasdonk on 1 June 1950.

== Works ==
=== Poetry ===
- Le Château des merveilles (1893)
- La Cithare (1897)
- Le Collier d'Opales (1899)
- Les Tombeaux (1900)
- Le Coffret d'ébène (1901)
- La Corbeille d'octobre (1902)
- Le Joli Mai (1905)
- La Victoire ailée (1921)

=== Drama ===
- Ce n'était qu'un rêve (1903)
- Madame reçoit (1908)
- Le Sire de Binche (unpublished)

== Honours ==
- 1932 : Commander of the Order of Leopold.
