= Blauwendael Castle =

Castle in Belgium

- Belgium
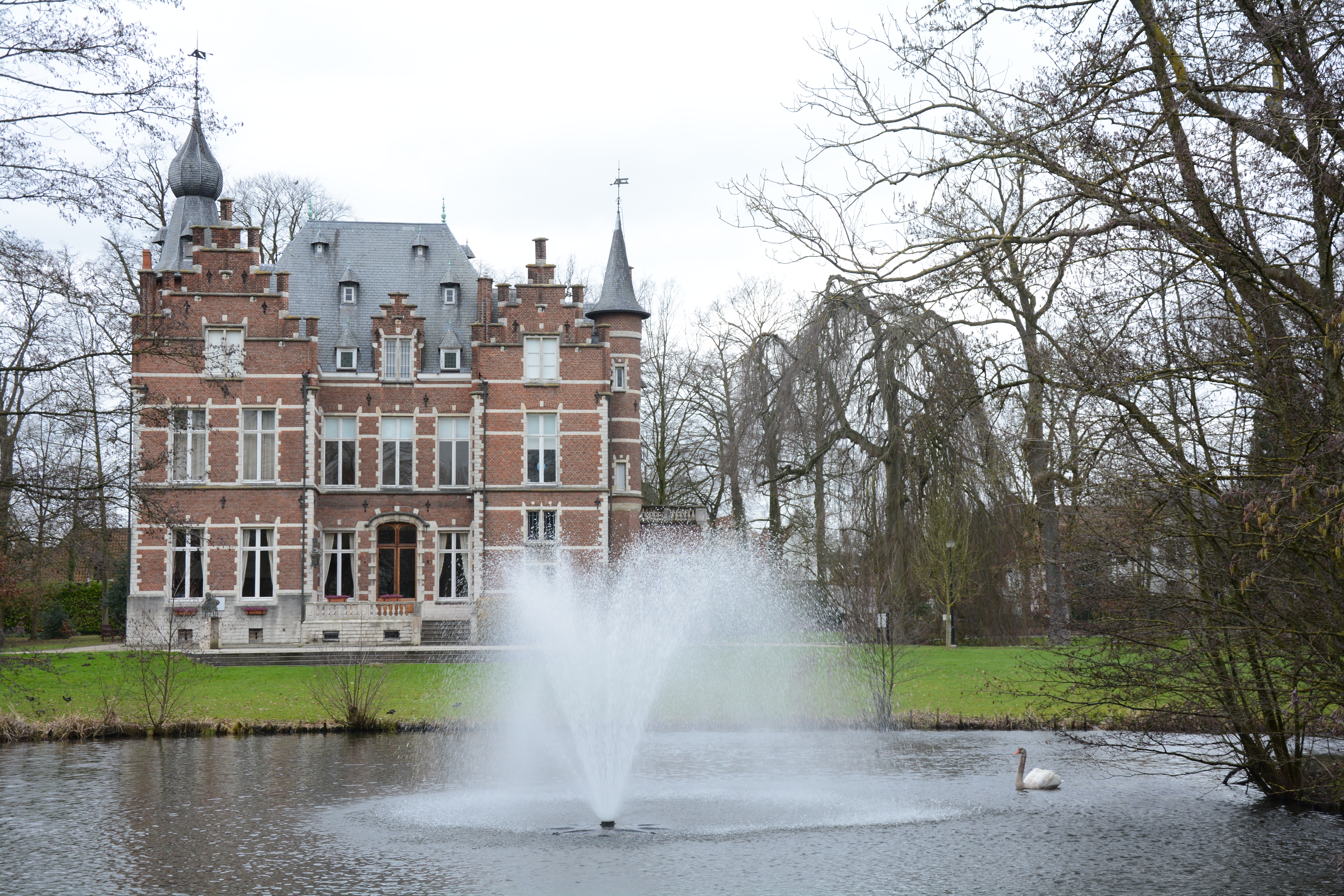

Site information
- Type: Castle

Location
- Coordinates: 51°6′29.15″N 4°4′56.56″E

Blauwendael Castle (Dutch: Kasteel Blauwendael) is a castle in the East Flemish town of Waasmunster, located at Kerkstraat 21.

The De Neve de Roden family owned a domain here, and in 1607–1608 Pieter de Neve built a moated mansion, known as the Huys int midden van't Durp and later known as 't Hof van Blauwendael. In 1820, at the behest of Henri Philips de Neve, changes were made to the surrounding park. Some constructions were demolished to make space for new ones, perhaps including the orangery. The pond is a remnant of the old castle's ramparts.

Between 1889 and 1890 a new castle was built by order of Emile de Neve de Roden and Emma de Bueren to a design by Jozef De Waele. Later the castle was sold to Henri de Lovinfosse. In 1980 the castle was bought by the municipality, which opened the park to the public in 1981. In 1984 the castle was used as a wedding hall, exhibition space.

== Building ==
It is a building in Flemish Neo-Renaissance style with turrets, stepped gables, etc. The interior is also designed in this style.
