= Willem van Waelwijck =

knight Willem van Waelwijck High Bailiff of Waas
- Portret of Guillaume de Waelwijc (c. 1550–1600)
- Monarch: Charles V, Holy Roman Emperor Felipe II of Spain

Personal details
- Spouse: Walburgis

Willem van Waelwijck, Lord of Walburg (French: Guillaume de Waelwijc) was a 16th-century Flemish nobleman and high bailiff of Waasland under the Holy Roman Empire. In 1553, Van Waelwijck established the Walburg Castle in Sint-Niklaas.

In 1540, Van Waelwijck gained the close favour of Emperor Charles V by supervising the construction of the Spanjaardenkasteel and serving in the imperial retinue. In 1561, he was removed from office, banished, and his property was confiscated by the Council of Flanders.

== High bailiff of Waasland (1552 to 1561) ==
Charles V, by Juan Pantoja de la Cruz (1605)

Willem van Waalwijck established his career as a secretary to the Habsburg crown, having supervised the financial administration and construction of the Spanjaardenkasteel in Ghent, a bastion designed by di Pellezuoli and Maccoilini. His administrative competence earned him the close favour of Emperor Charles V, leading to his induction into the imperial retinue. While accompanying the Emperor on campaigns across Spain, Italy, and the Holy Roman Empire, van Waalwijck further distinguished himself as a knight on the battlefield. His success secured him a stellar reputation and the personal favor of Charles V, resulting in his appointment as high bailiff of Waasland in 1552.

In 1561, after having served as high bailiff a nine years, the Council of Flanders removed him from office for large-scale fraud and misconduct. His property was confiscated, and he was banished for fifty years. Although Margaret of Parma granted him a personal pardon in 1564 and restored his assets, he was permanently barred from holding a bailiff office, and the Van Steelant family regained control of the position.

== Walburg Castle ==
Walburg Castle

On February 20, 1550, Charles V had issued an official imperial charter granting Knight Willem van Waelwijck permission to merge the medieval estates of Van der Moeren and Willemaers, establishing the "Hof van Walburg", named in honour of Van Waelwijck's wife, Walburgis.

Van Waelwijck completely cleared the medieval ruins that sat on the property and by 1553, he finished constructing a grand moated castle made of traditional local brick and white sandstone.

== Heraldry ==
19th-century painting of the coat of arms of the Van Waalwijk van Doorn family is quarterly, combining the coat of arms of the Van Doorn family (wolfsangels) with the coat of arms of the Van Waelwijck family (millrinds)
