= Guillaume de Waelwijc =

16th-century Flemish aristocrat

Guillaume de Waelwijck
- Portrait of Guillaume de Waelwijck (c. 1550–1600)

Hoogbaljuw of the Land of Waas
- In office 1552–1561
- Monarch: Charles V, Holy Roman Emperor

Personal details
- Spouse: Walburgis

Guillaume de Waelwijck (Dutch: Willem van Waelwijck) was a 16th-century Flemish aristocrat who served as hoogbaljuw of the Land of Waas from 1552 to 1561. De Waelwijck had the Walburg Castle built in Sint-Niklaas.
