= Nieuwkerken-Waas =

Nieuwekerken-Waas
- Village
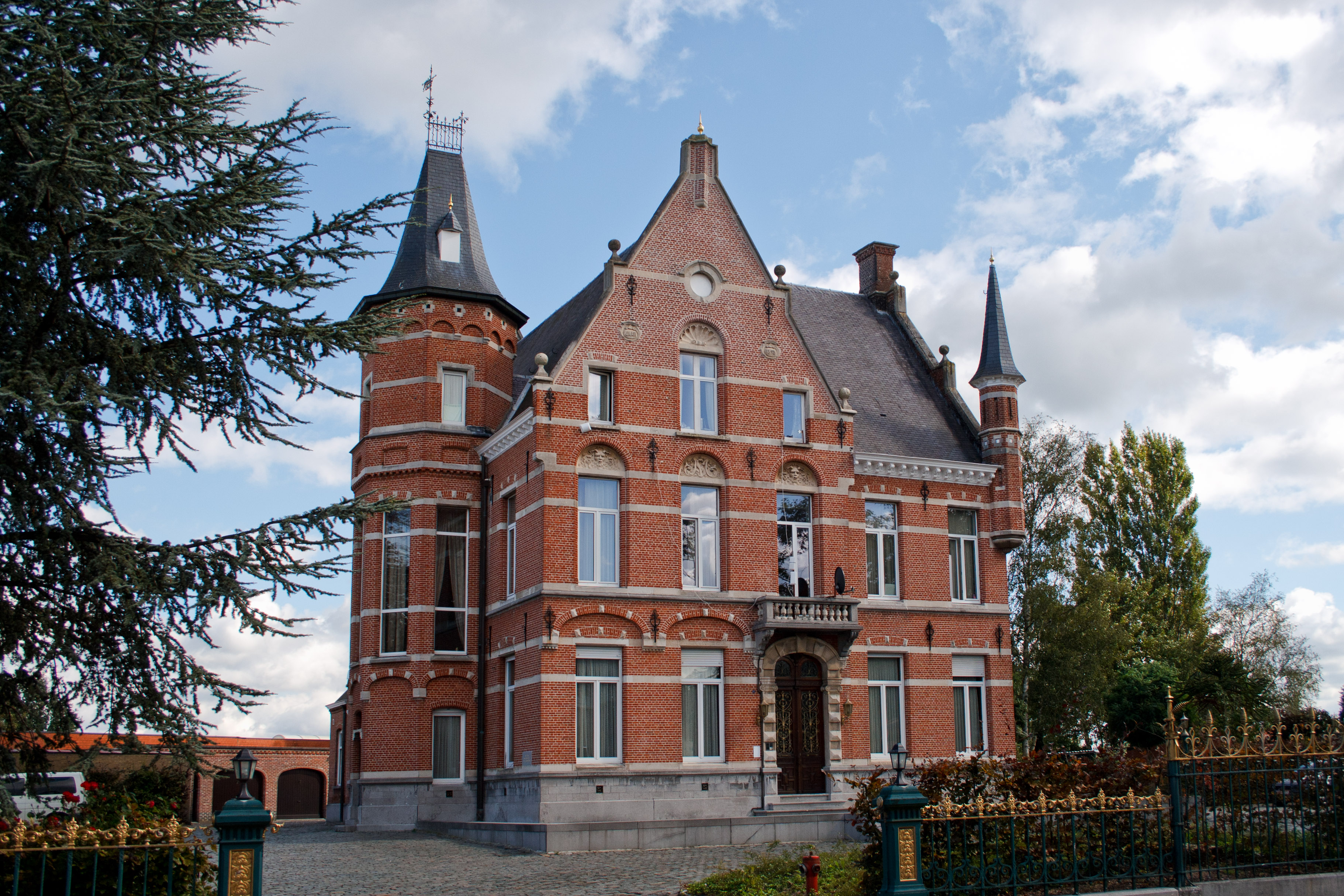
- Torenhof Castle

- Location in Belgium
- Country: Belgium
- Region: Flemish Region
- Province: East Flanders
- Municipality: Sint-Niklaas

Area
  - Total: 10.04 km^{2} (3.88 sq mi)

Population (2021)
  - Total: 6,095
  - Density: 607.1/km^{2} (1,572/sq mi)
- Time zone: CET

Nieuwkerken-Waas is a village in the Belgian province East Flanders. Since 1977, it has been a subdivision (deelgemeente) of the municipality of Sint-Niklaas.

== History ==
In comparison with towns bordering Sint-Niklaas such as Waasmunster, Belsele and Temse, Nieuwkerken is a much younger village. It was first mentioned in 1143, and became independent from Sint-Niklaas on in 1294. On 1 January 1977, it became a part of the larger Sint-Niklaas area.

According to historians Frans De Potter and Jan Brouckaert, the first church was built in 1294 by Jacob Van Lent, pastor in Sint-Niklaas. The church was largely destroyed by a fire in 1646. A new church was built in 1793.

== Legend ==
At a certain evening a shepherd walked home through the woods with his flock of sheep. He noticed a small Mother Mary statue standing in a hollow tree. He took the statue home, put it on the table and went to sleep. When he woke up in the morning, the statue was gone. As the man went back on the road with his flock, he was surprised to see the statue standing in the hollow tree again. He could not resist to take the statue home again, but this time he hid the statue from plain sight and put it in a drawer. The next morning the statue was standing again where it belonged in the hollow tree. The shepherd was baffled, took it again and put it in a big wooden box, sealed with an iron chain around it. He could not believe it. The statue disappeared from the box and was to be found in the hollow tree. The story was heard by the community in the area and they decided to build a chapel for Mother Mary. The chapel became a site of pilgrimage.

The chapel was ultimately replaced by the church we know today.

== Gallery ==
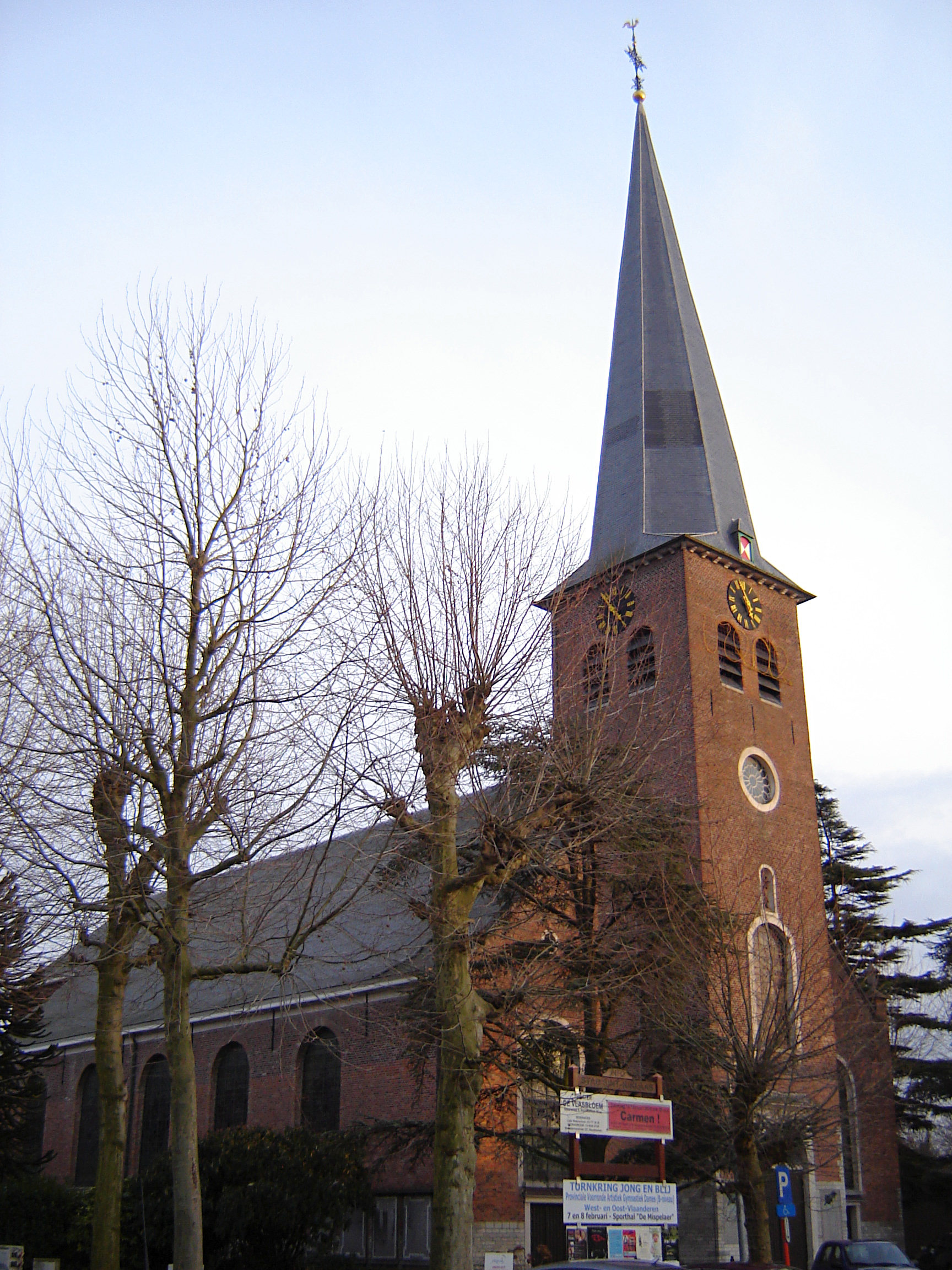
Our Lady of the Forest Church

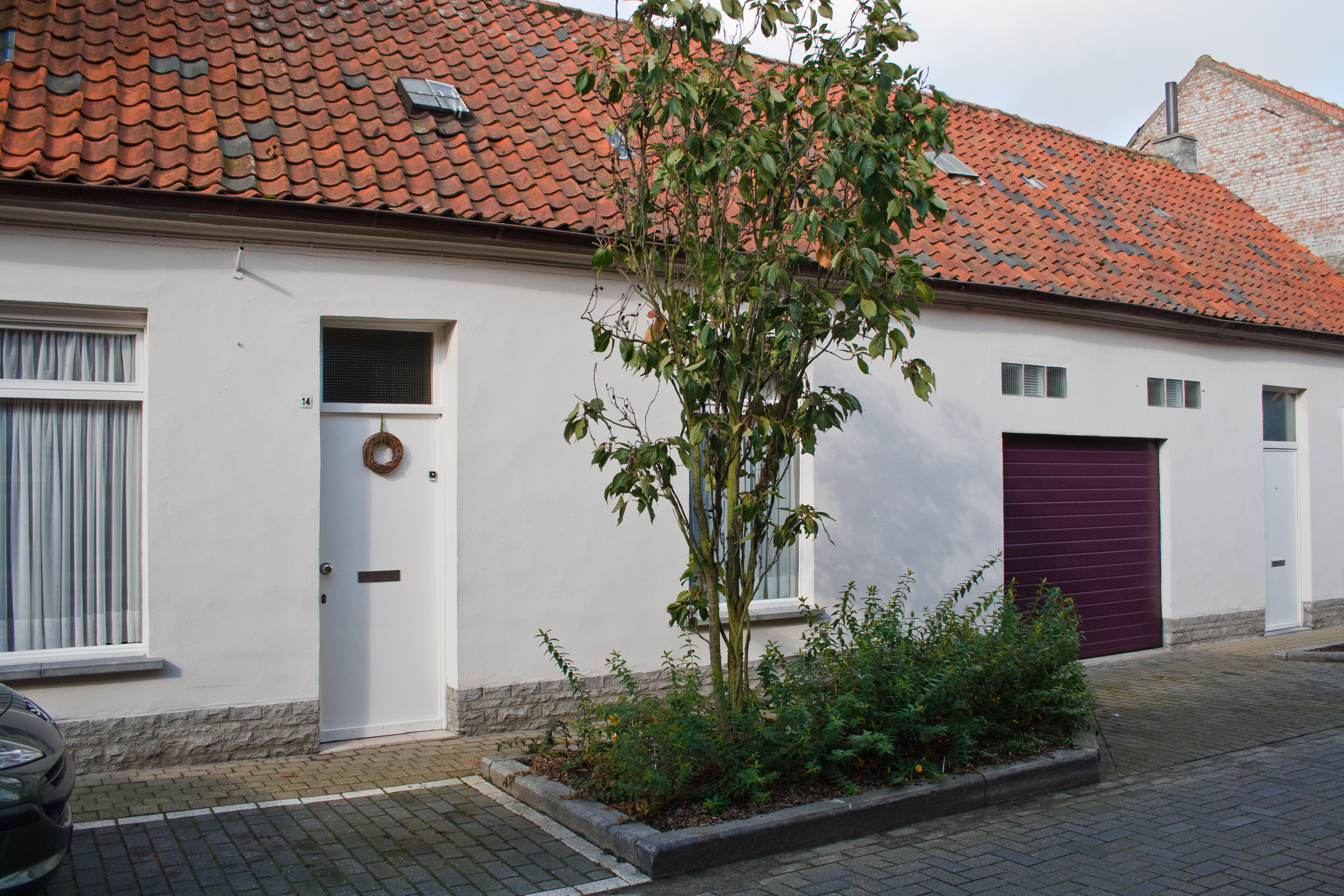
Double house

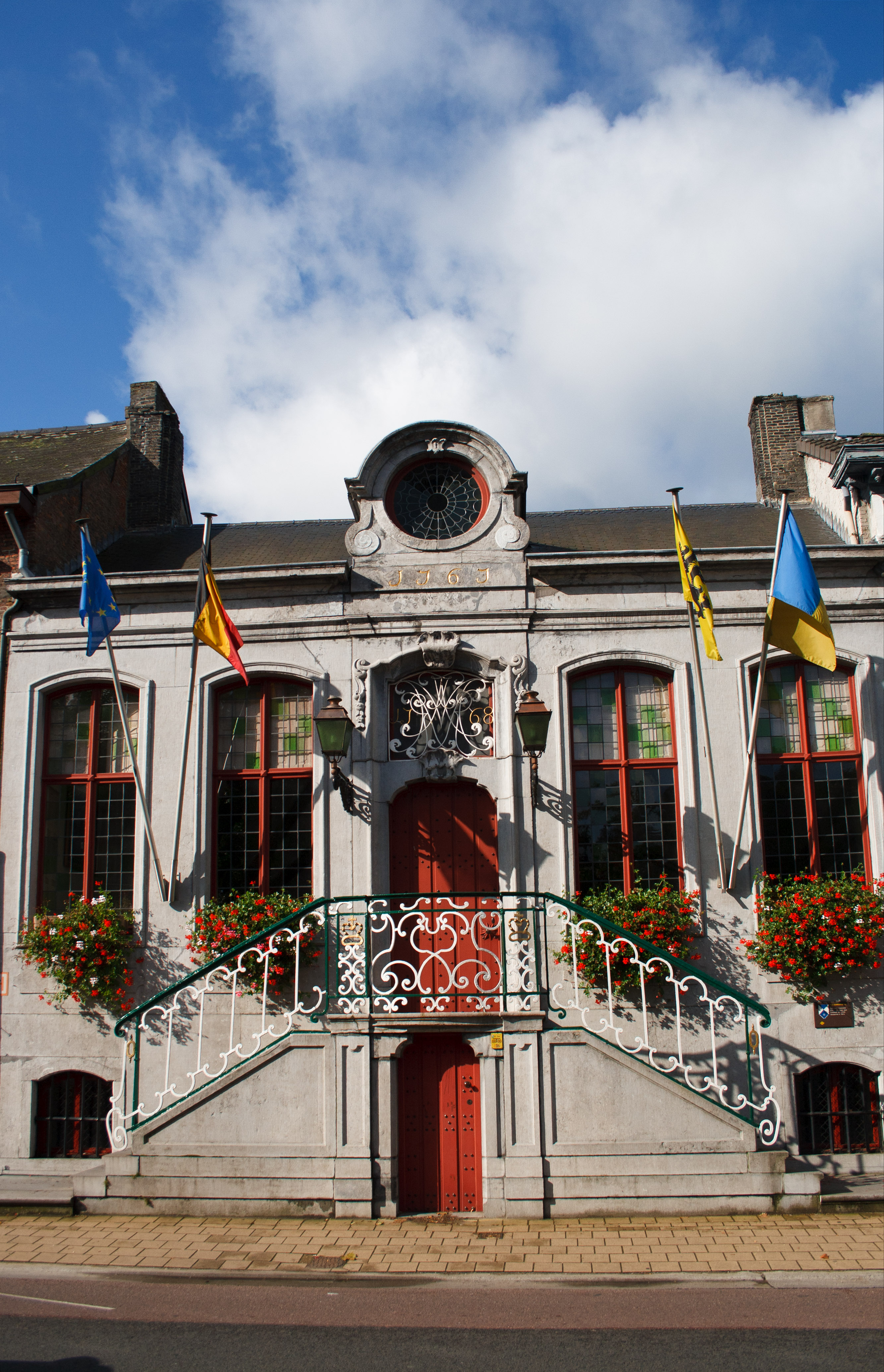
Former town hall

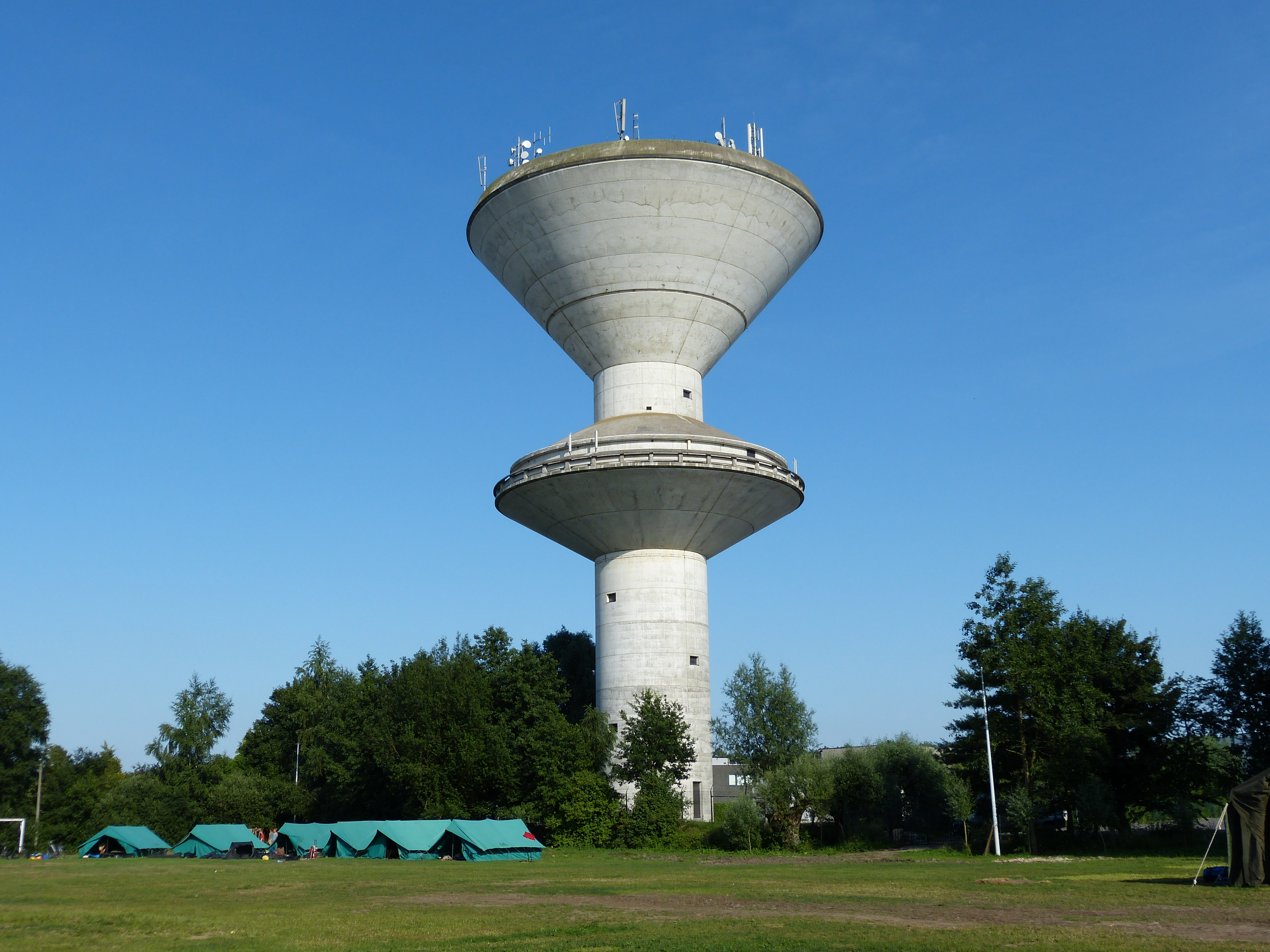
Water tower
