= Wouter Van Bellingen =

Belgian politician

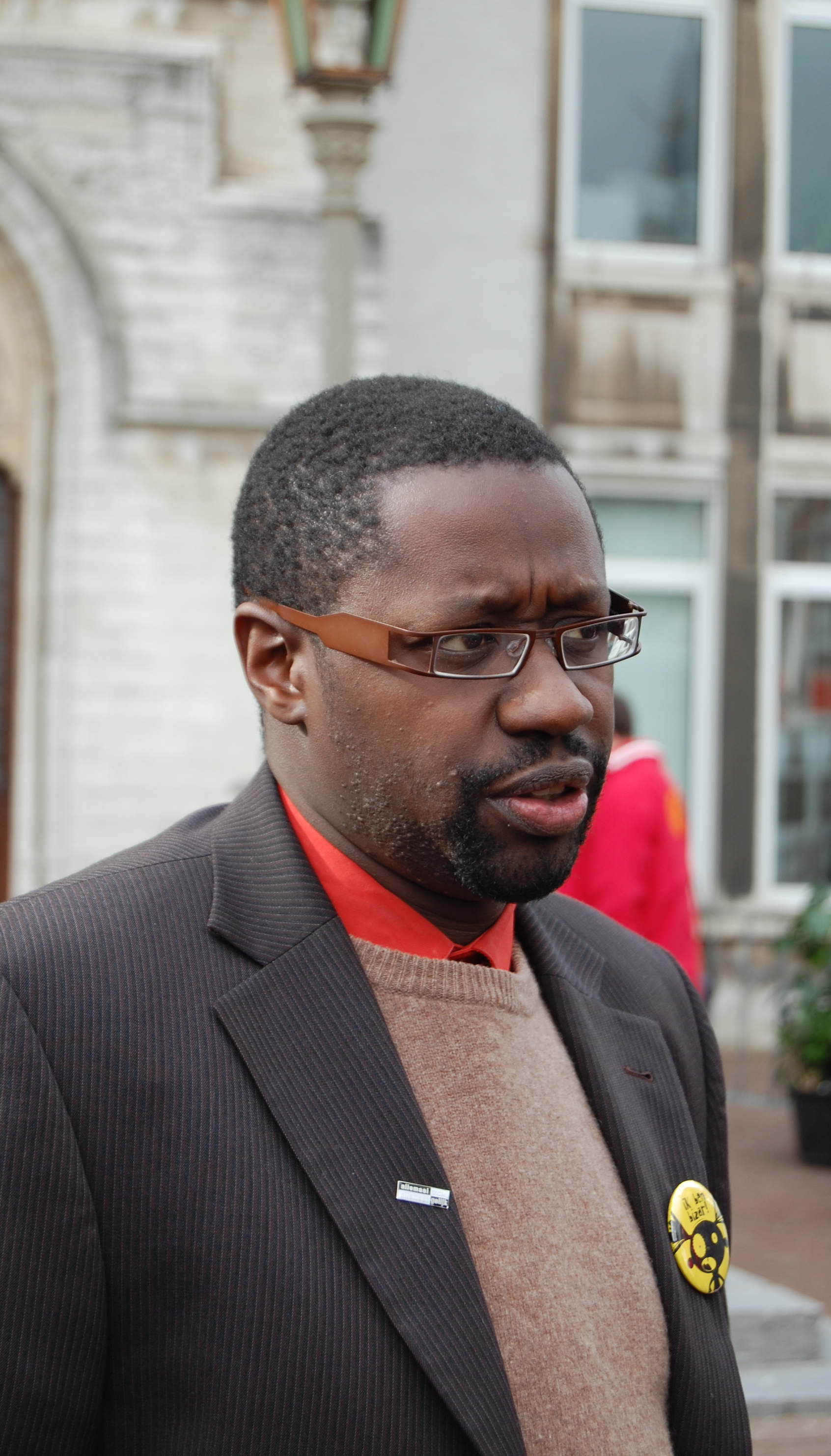
- Wouter Van Bellingen at the multicultural mass wedding event in 2007
- Born: 20 April 1972 (age 53); Antwerp, Belgium
- Occupation: Politician

Wouter Van Bellingen (born 20 April 1972) is a Rwandan-born Belgian politician for the Sociaal-Liberale Partij. He was previously employed by the city of Sint-Niklaas as a civil servant working on youth and developing world issues.

Since 2 January 2007, Van Bellingen is an alderman in Sint-Niklaas, where he lives. As such, he became the first black alderman in Flanders. He is responsible for the city's activities related to youths, parties, international projects, civilian affairs and the civil registry and some administrative functions.

Van Bellingen drew media attention in February 2007 when it was reported that 3 couples cancelled their wedding ceremony because they didn't want to be wed by a black registrar. In response to the event, Van Bellingen decided to organise a multicultural wedding event on 21 March 2007, which is also the International Day for the Elimination of Racial Discrimination. 626 couples were symbolically married by Van Bellingen that day and this event was perceived as a strong anti-racism signal.

Van Bellingen was placed for adoption by his Rwandan mother. He grew up in Sint-Niklaas as the youngest son in a family with 4 adopted children. He is married and has 2 children. He was very active in the different sections of the youth councils in Flanders, and a scouting leader.
