= Huis Janssens =

Mansion and museum in Sint-Niklaas, Belgium

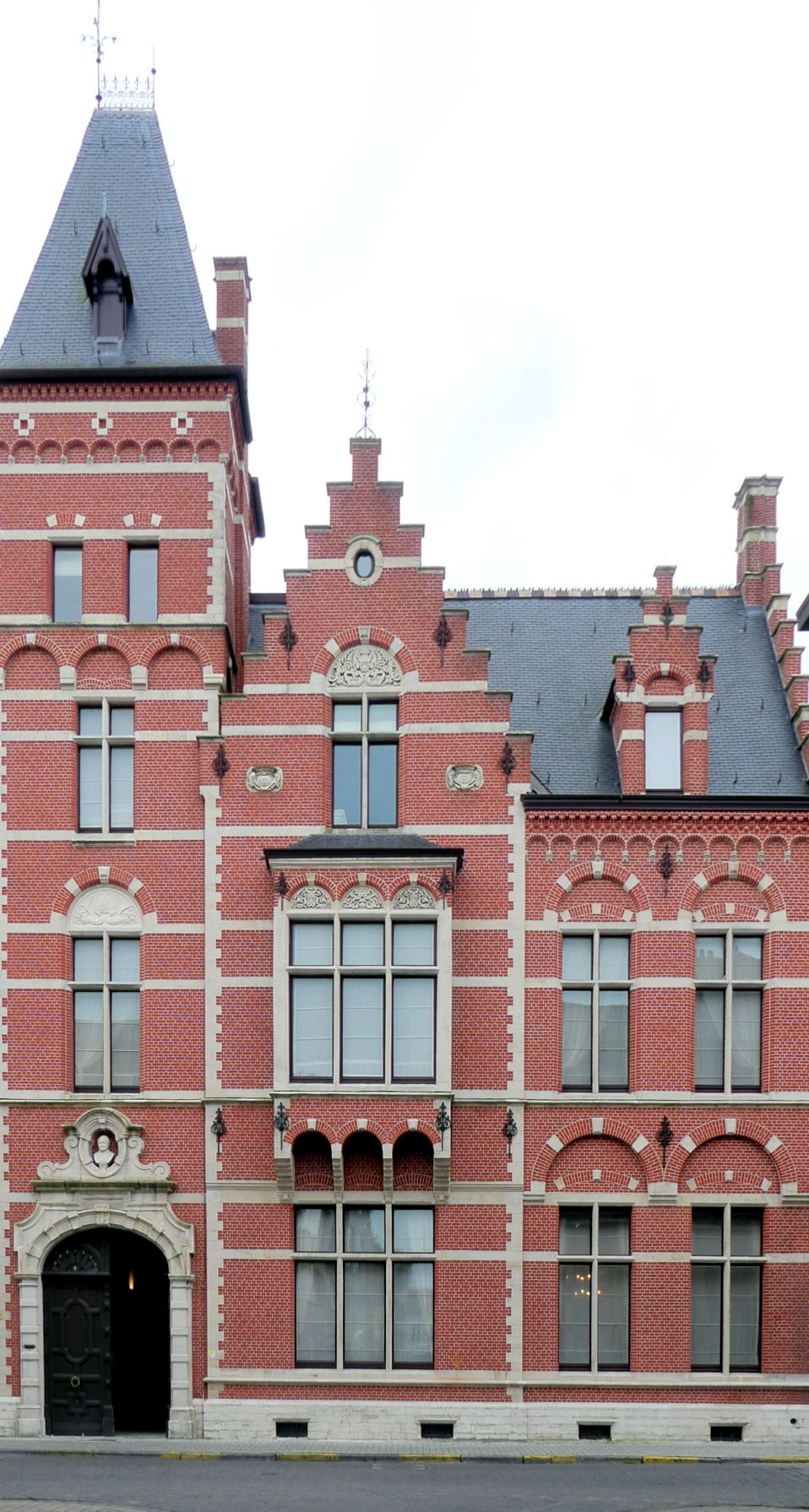
"Huis Janssens" Sint-Niklaas in 2024.

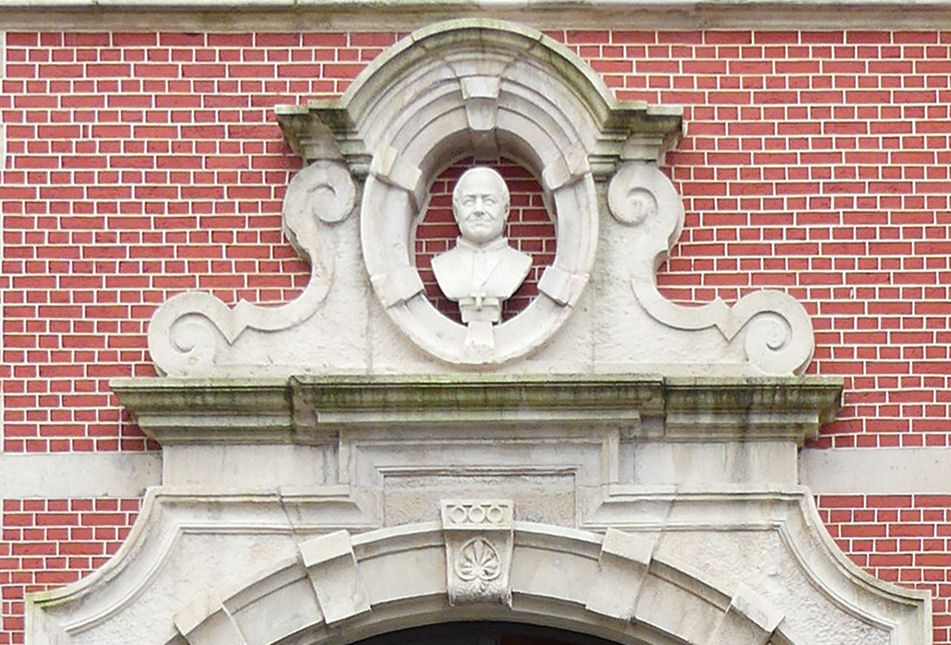
Detail: bust of pope Pius.

The Huis Janssens is a former private mansion and a museum in the Belgian city of Sint-Niklaas, owned by the city.

== History ==
The eclectic building was commissioned in 1878 by Alfons Janssens, a textile manufacturer and later politician of the Catholic Party. Pieter Van Kerkhove, who had also already drawn up the design of the new town hall of Sint-Niklaas, was the architect. At the beginning of the 20th century, the building was donated to the city. The condition was that it would be used for art and science. The Koninklijke Oudheidkundige Kring van het Land van Waas (KOKW) set up a museum and a library there, and the building was renovated.

Renovation of the building began in 2016, for which the bricks of the exterior facade were repainted red, piece by piece. The interior renovation was also carried out and Huis Janssens should henceforth take over the museum function of the Salons of Fine Arts. Huis Janssens, together with the Mercator Museum and the SteM Zwijgershoek, forms one large museum site.

The house has been protected since 2005.

The former garden of the mansion is now the Mercator Park.
