= Henri Van Severen =

Belgian gold embroiderer

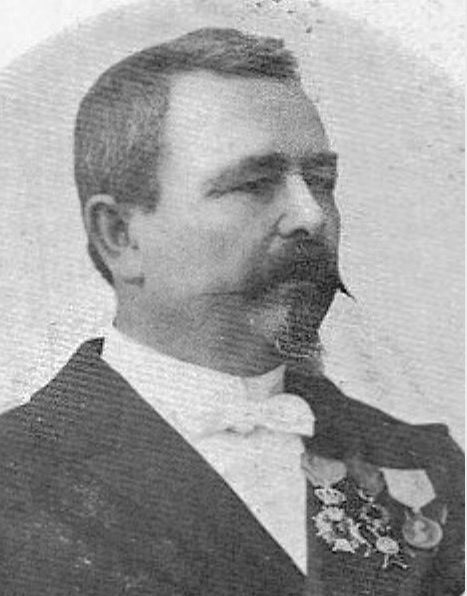
Henri Van Severen-Ente

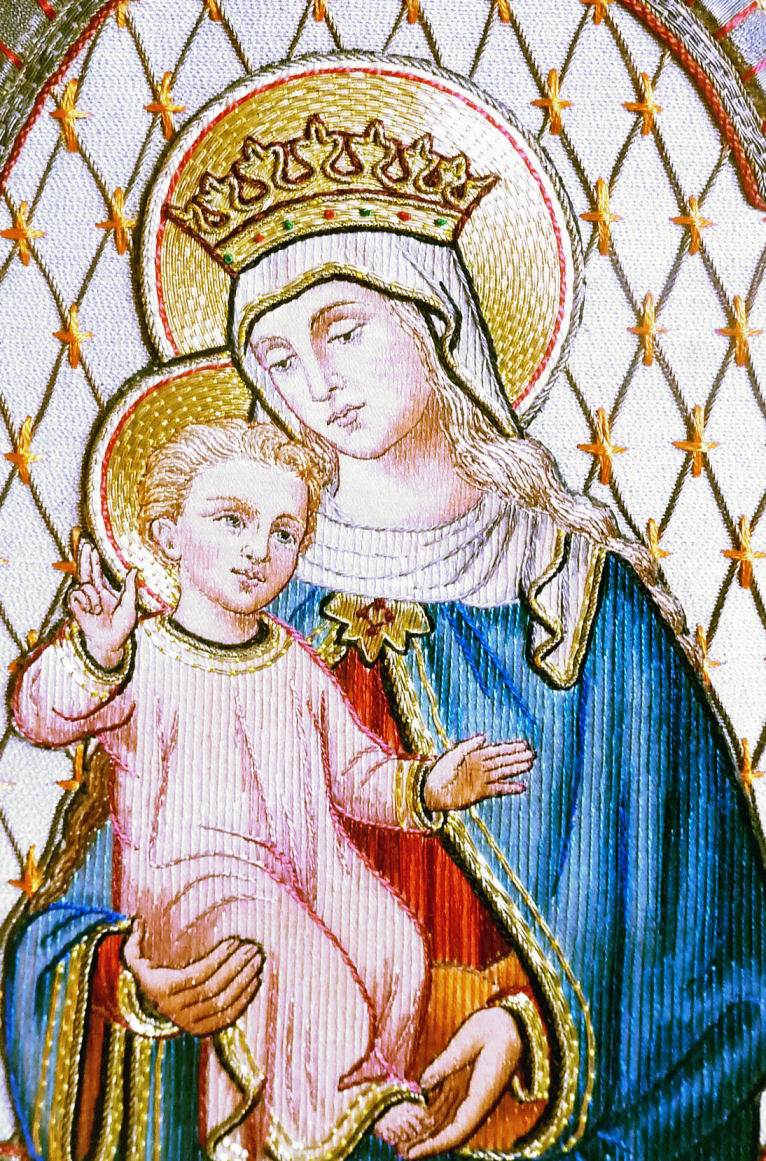
Fragment of a cope

Henri Van Severen-Ente was a famous gold-embroiderer from Sint-Niklaas. His works for clergy and important churches are of fine quality.

Van Severen was a son of Jean-Baptiste, who established the Van Severen-Manufacture ca 1830. During his youth he left his father's factory to go to Rome as papal zouave. His father died in 1871, and he became a master-embroiderer.

His works are typically neo-Gothic, and his processional banners are famous for their size and quality. He specialised in important restorations of old vestments.

When he died in 1923 his widow, Emma Ente, continued the work until her death.

== Medals ==
- Silver Medal: 1885 Exposition of Antwerp
- Gold Medal: 1888 Exposition of Barcelona
- Gold Medal: 1888 Exposition of Brussels
- Gold Medal: 1888 Exposiotion of London
- Grand Prix: 1910 Exposition of Brussels
