= Lieven Dehandschutter =

Belgian politician (born 1958)

Member of the Flemish Parliament
- Incumbent
- Assumed office 7 June 2009

Personal details
- Born: 9 June 1958 (age 67) Sint-Niklaas, East Flanders
- Party: N-VA
- Website: http://www.n-va.be/cv/lieven-dehandschutter

Lieven Dehandschutter (born 9 June 1958 in Sint-Niklaas) is a Belgian politician and is affiliated to the N-VA. He was elected as a member of the Flemish Parliament in 2009.
