= Spanjaardenkasteel =

Demolished castle in Ghent, Belgium

Coordinates: 51.0542°N 3.7372°E

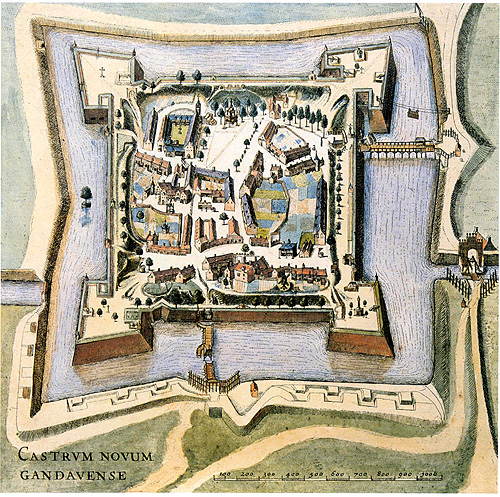
The Spaniards' Castle on a map by Antoon Sanders in 1641

The Spanjaardenkasteel ("Spaniards' Castle") was a castle in the city of Ghent in present-day Belgium.

The castle was commissioned in 1540 by the Holy Roman Emperor and Spanish king Charles V after he crushed a rebellion by the city. The castle housed a garrison of about 2,500 men. The castle was eventually demolished in the 19th century.
