= Sint-Niklaas =

Sint-Niklaas: Saint-Nicolas (French)
- City and municipality
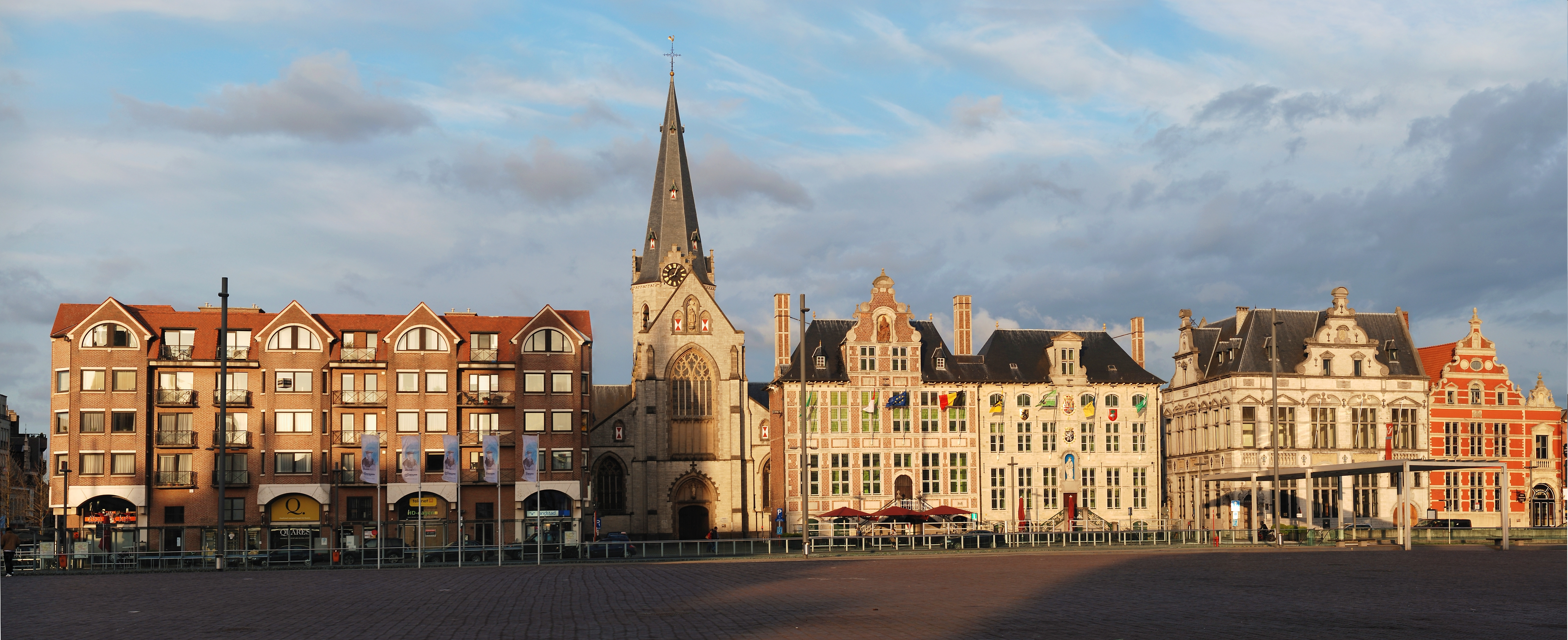

- Flag Coat of arms

- Location of Sint-Niklaas in East Flanders
- Interactive map of Sint-Niklaas
- Location in Belgium
- Coordinates: 51°10′N 04°08′E
- Country: Belgium
- Community: Flemish Community
- Region: Flemish Region
- Province: East Flanders
- Arrondissement: Sint-Niklaas

Government
  - Mayor: Lieven Dehandschutter (N-VA)
  - Governing party: N-VA - Groen - OpenVLD

Area
  - Total: 84.2 km^{2} (32.5 sq mi)

Population (2022-01-01)
  - Total: 80,167
  - Density: 952/km^{2} (2,470/sq mi)
- Postal codes: 9100, 9111, 9112
- NIS code: 46021
- Area codes: 03
- Website: www.sint-niklaas.be

Sint-Niklaas (Dutch: [ˌsɪnt nɪˈklaːs]; French: Saint-Nicolas, [sɛ̃ nikɔla]) is a Belgian city and municipality located in the Flemish province of East Flanders. The municipality comprises the city of Sint-Niklaas proper and the towns of Belsele, Nieuwkerken-Waas, and Sinaai.

Sint-Niklaas is the capital and major city of the Waasland region straddling the East Flanders and Antwerp provinces. The city is known for having the largest market square in Belgium. At one point this square also boasted the largest Christmas tree, and the largest easter egg in Europe.

== History ==
=== Thirteenth-century origins ===
Although some traces of pre-Roman activity have been found on the territory of Sint-Niklaas, the regional centre during Roman times was neighbouring Waasmunster, better located on the river Durme. Belsele was already mentioned in a 9th-century document. The history of Sint-Niklaas proper, however, starts in 1217, when the bishop of Tournai, following advice from the local clergy, founded a church dedicated to Saint Nicholas here. The new parish was to depend on the See of Tournai until the middle of the 16th century. Politically, however, it was part of the County of Flanders. The power of Flanders at that time favoured the rapid economic development of the city, which became the administrative centre of the region in 1241. A document dated from 1248 records that Margaret II, Countess of Flanders, ceded additional territory to the parish of Sint-Niklaas with the proviso that it would remain bare, which explains the unusual size of the central market square today.

=== 14th–17th centuries ===
The city was never walled, which made it an easy target for conquest. In 1381, it was engulfed by fire and plundered. However, the central location of Sint-Niklaas between Ghent and Antwerp, not far from the Scheldt, favoured further development. By 1513, Emperor Maximilian had granted the city the right to hold a weekly market. In 1550, Emperor Charles V granted the knight Willem van Waelwijck, the high bailiff of the Waas region, formal permission to merge two estates and construct the Walburg Castle. The 17th century was generally a period of prosperity that was marked by economic growth, mostly in the flax and wool industries. This was also the time when Sint-Niklaas was endowed with administrative buildings and three cloistered communities (Oratorians, Franciscans, and Black Sisters), which provided educational, religious, and medical services to the region. On 25 May 1690 another fire destroyed most of the city. During this period the famous Spanish noble family Sanchez de Castro y Toledo resided in Sint-Niklaas.

=== 18th century until now ===
In the 18th century, the Austrian regime was favourable to Sint-Niklaas. The flagship textile industry adapted well to mechanization and added cotton products to its portfolio in 1764. At the end of the century, the French Revolution brought its mixture of religious intolerance and modern administration to the city. Napoleon came to visit Sint-Niklaas in 1803 and officially promoted it to the rank of city. The 19th century witnessed a general decline in the textile industry. Several new buildings were erected, including the current city hall and the Onze-Lieve-Vrouwekerk (Church of Our-Lady).

During the start of World War II, Sint-Niklaas was bombed multiple times by the German forces. On May 10 1940, the first bombing took place by the Luftwaffe. The road leading from Ghent to Antwerp (today known as the N70 motorway) was hit by incendiary bombs at the height of Tereken and the Baenslandwijk, causing no major damage and only 15 injuries. Two days later, on the 12th of May, when the Ankerstraat, Antwerpse Steenweg, Klein Hulst, Lindenstraat en Papenakkerstraat were all hit by brisance and incendiary bombs. The attack killed two civilians and caused the local Dean to burn to the ground. The biggest attack happened on the 17th of May: at around 12:30, bombs of either 2 or 4 Luftwaffe planes hit the Dalstraat, Gasmeterstraat, Molendreef (today known as the Kroonmolenstraat) and the Spoorweglaan. The bombing raid caused considerable damage and killed over 80 civilians of the city, including 2 soldiers. 70 civilians were killed instantly. 51 of these deaths were refugees from the Dutch city of Breda who were travelling to Antwerp. They hid in the local female elementary school at the Gasmeterstraat when the school was hit. After this attack, two more followed. On the 19th of May, an air raid with brisance bombs killed 8 civilians and injured 20 more. A bomb also hit the church of Saint Nicholas from the roof but failed to detonate, saving the church from complete destruction. Two other bombs destroyed the leaded windows of the church. On the 28th of May, the last bombing raid on Sint-Niklaas occurred. The Hertenstraat was hit by the Luftwaffe, hitting three residential buildings as a result and injuring one civilian, who later died at the hospital.

After WWII, the textile industry of Sint-Niklaas never recovered and went through a crisis. Today, the historic centre of the city has become mostly a shopping and services district.

== Heritage ==
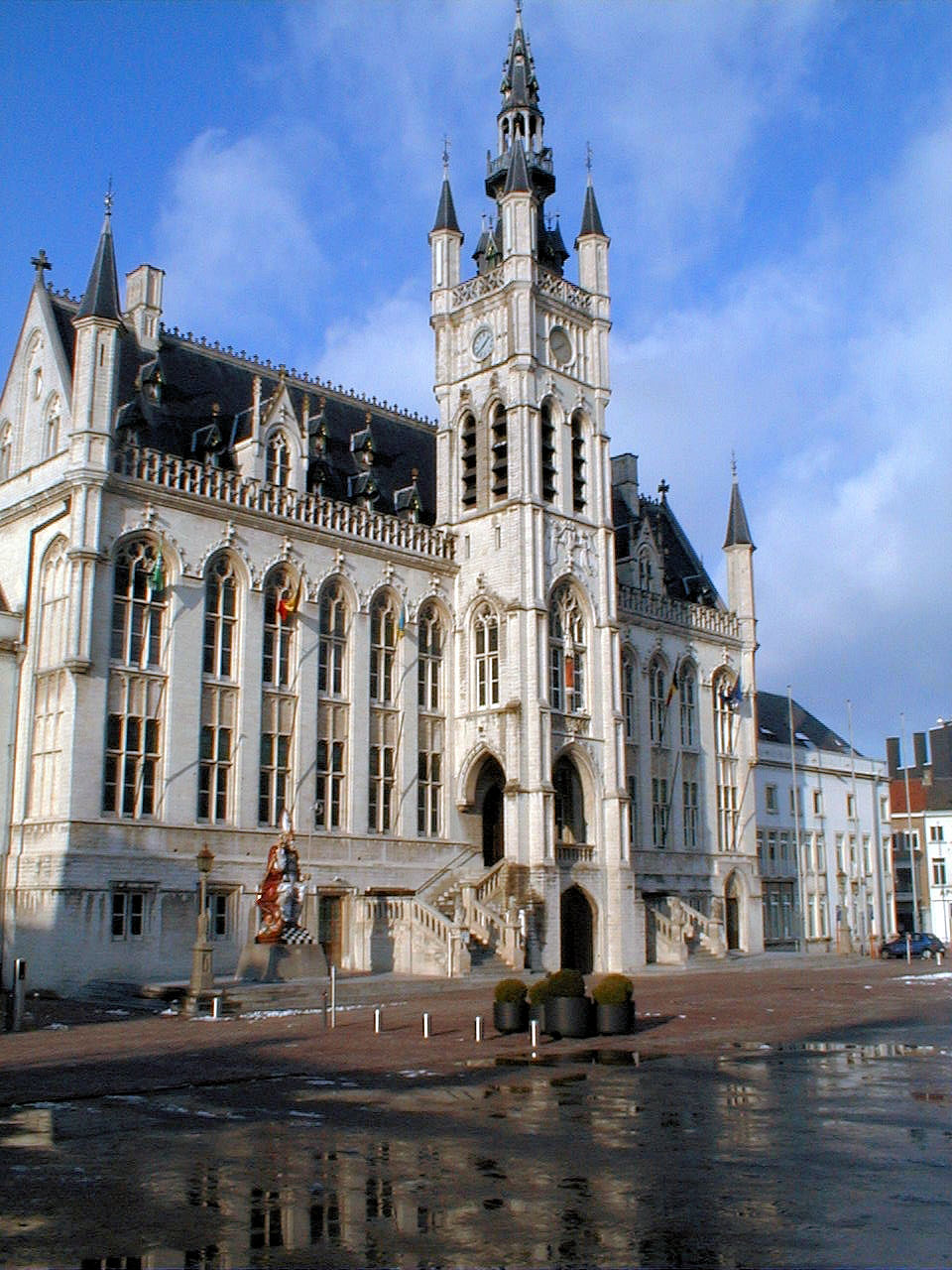
Sint-Niklaas Town Hall

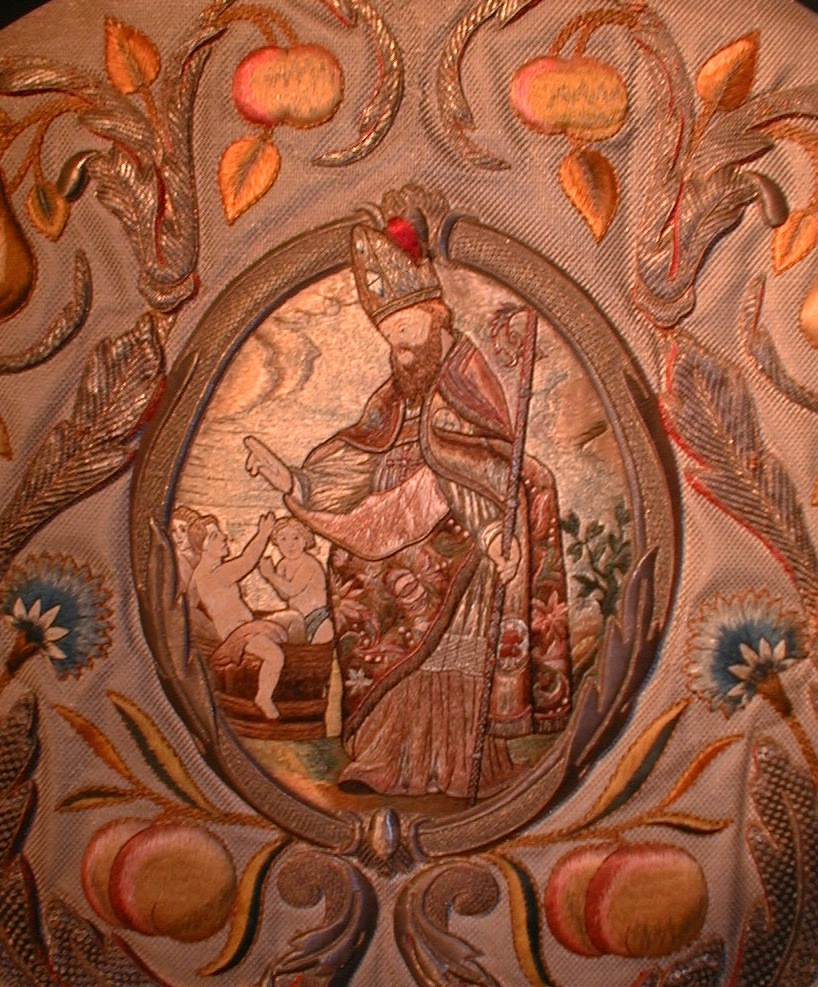
Saint-Nicholas, 17th century embroidery restored by Henri Van Severen

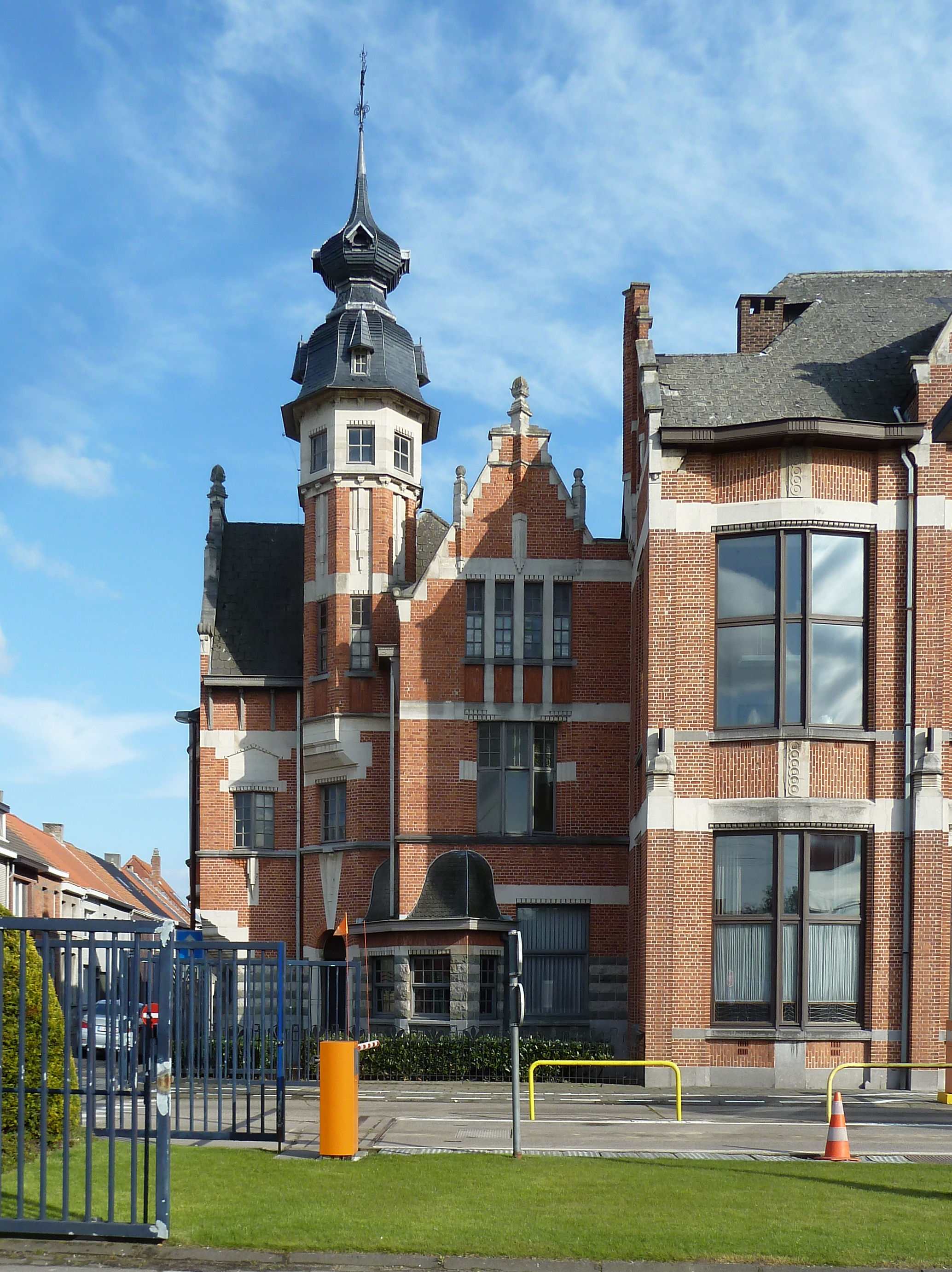
Scheerders van Kerchove, united factories

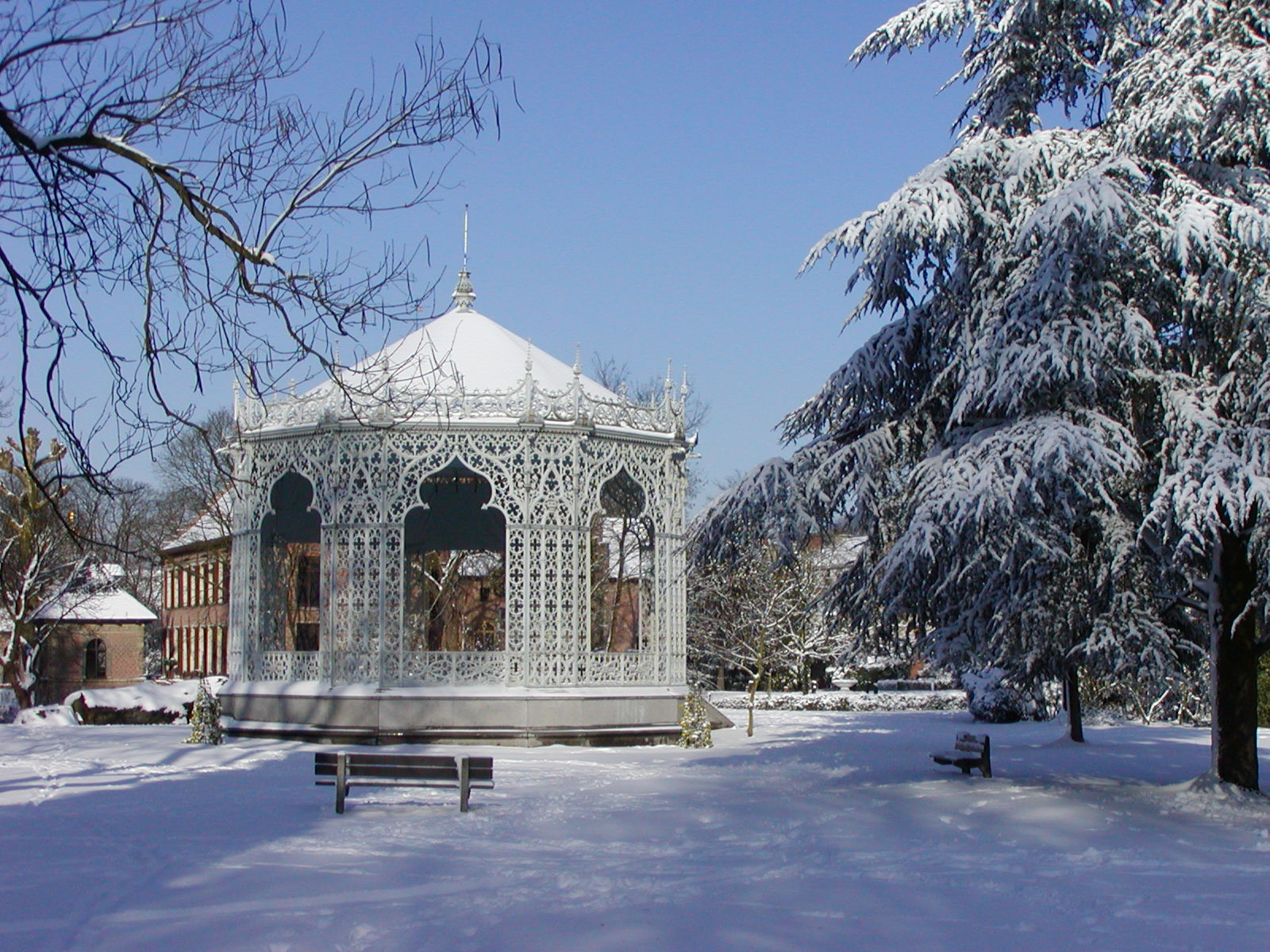
The main kiosk in Gothic revival

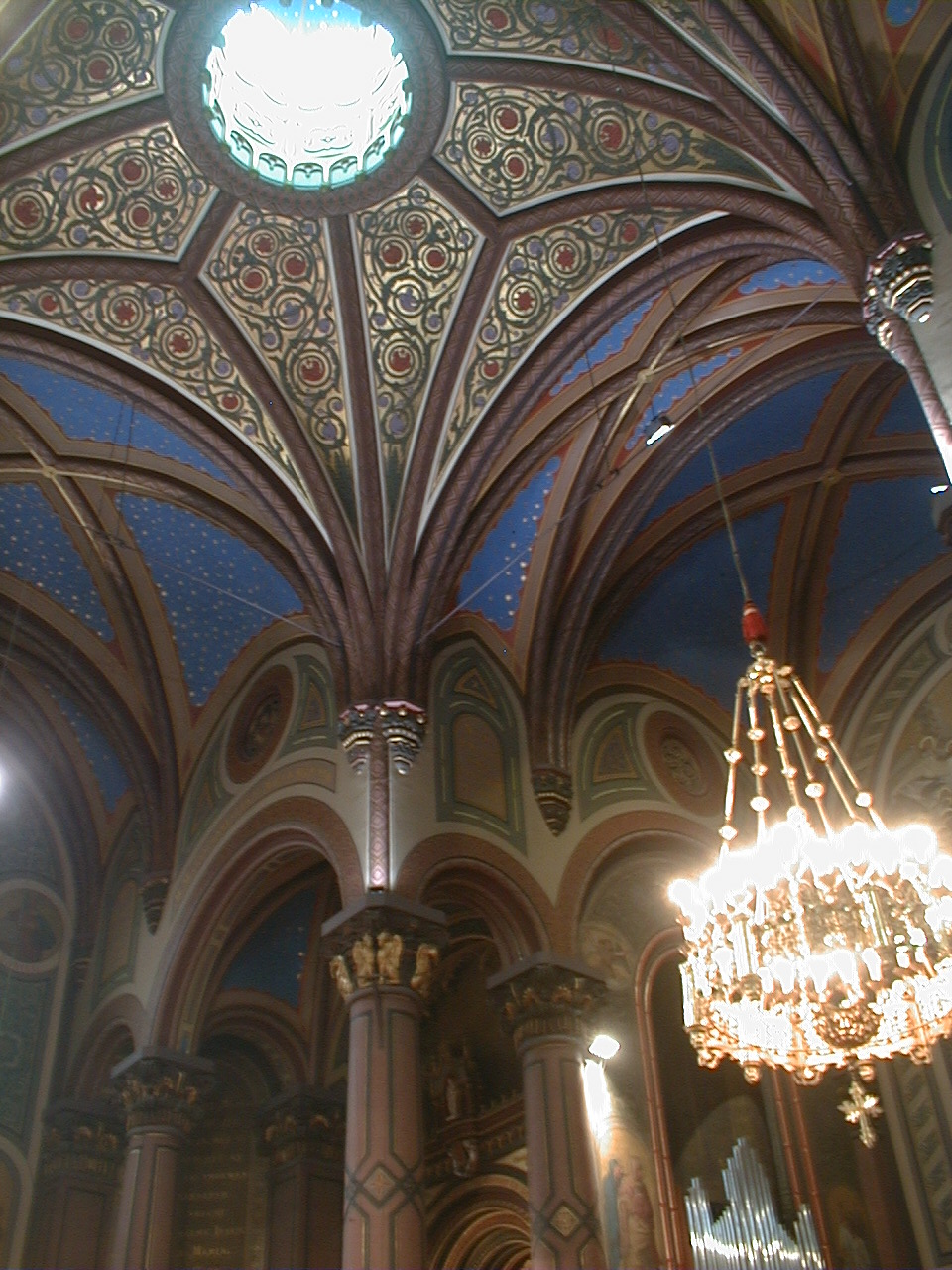
Fresco in Neo Byzantine style of the Church of Our Lady

- The main Church of Saint Nicholas was founded in the 13th century and gave its name to the city. After heavy damage in the 16th century, the interior was redone in the Baroque style.
- St. Joseph Minor Seminary, catholic school.
- The Onze-Lieve-Vrouwekerk (Sint Niklaas, built in the 19th century, famous for its Byzantine revival interior, and 6m tall statue of our lady on top, covered in fine gold.
- Town Hall, in gothical revival style, was built after the old hall burned down.
- The largest market square in Belgium, founded by Margaret II, Countess of Flanders.
- The Gerardus Mercator Museum traces the history of cartography back to its origins. The museum also houses two original globes that belonged to the famous cartographer.
- Other churches and museums include: Saint Joseph, Christ the King, Saloons of Fine Arts and Zwijgershoek.
- The Huis Janssens

== Events ==
- On the first weekend of September, Sint-Niklaas hosts an international balloon meeting ("Vredesfeesten") and a three-day music festival called "Villa Pace".
- During the last week of the year, Sint-Niklaas is the host of the Flanders Volley Gala, an international volleyball tournament.
- The city hosts seven processional giants: Janneken, Mieke, Sinterklaas and Zwarte Piet, and the three Magi: Caspar, Melchior, and Balthasar.

== Transportation ==
Because of its location on the vital axis from Ghent to Antwerp, Sint-Niklaas has excellent connections by train and car. The E17, one of Belgium's busiest highways, passes the city; the N16 dual carriageway leads to Mechelen and Brussels.

Trains depart every half-hour to Ghent and Antwerp and hourly to Brussels, Mechelen and Leuven from the new railway station. The city also has an extensive network of buslines, both regional and local. Throughout the city's main thoroughfares, buses drive in designated lanes.

Sint-Niklaas was awarded the title of Most Pedestrian Friendly City in Flanders after the restoration of its central Market area.

== Mayors ==
Mayors since the end of World War II:

- Henri Heyman (Catholic) (1933–1946);
- Romain De Vidts (CVP, now CD&V) (1947–1962);
- Frantz Van Dorpe (CVP, now CD&V);
- Paul De Vidts (CVP, now CD&V) (1977–1988);
- Lieven Lenaerts (CVP, now CD&V) (1995–1996);
- Jef Foubert (CVP, now CD&V) (1997–2000);
- Freddy Willockx (SP.A, now Vooruit) (1989–1994 and 2001 - June 2010);
- Christel Geerts, the first female mayor of Sint-Niklaas. (SP.A, now Vooruit) (July 2010 - 2012);
- Lieven Dehandschutter (N-VA) (2013 - ).

== Famous citizens ==
- Alex Callier and Raymond Geerts, musicians (Hooverphonic)
- Philip Coppens, author (1971–2012)
- Maurits Coppieters, politician (1920–2005)
- August de Maere, engineer, creator of the Zeebrugge Port (1802–1885)
- Martin De Prycker, engineer, CEO of Barco (b. 1955)
- Els de Schepper, Flemish actress, comedian and writer (b. 1965)
- Sean Dhondt, TV presenter and leadsinger 'Nailpin' (b. 1984)
- Ilyo Hansen, author (b.1966)
- Gustaaf Joos, cardinal
- Tom Lanoye, author (b. 1958)
- Sven Maes, DJ (b. 1973)
- Daniël Ost, florist (b. 1955)
- Luis Siret, archaeologist and illustrator (1869–1934)
- Marc Sleen, comics artist (1922–2016)
- Woodie Smalls, rapper (b. 1996)
- Paul Snoek, poet (1933–1981)
- Tom Steels, road cyclist (b. 1971)
- Antoon Stillemans, bishop of Ghent (1832-1916)
- Edgar Tinel, composer, born in Sinaai (1854–1912)
- Marc Vael, computer scientist (b. 1967)
- Wouter Van Bellingen, politician (b. 1972)
- Sandrine Van Handenhoven, artist (b. 1984)
- Henri Van Severen, gold embroiderer
- Anton van Wilderode, poet (1918–1998)
- Angelo Vermeulen, visual artist (b.1971)
- Yari Verschaeren, footballer (b. 2001)
- Lisa Verschueren, gymnast (b. 1995)
- Jan Vertonghen, footballer (b. 1987)
- Erik Wijmeersch, athlete (b.1970)

== International relations ==
=== Twin towns — Sister cities ===
Sint-Niklaas is twinned with:

Colmar, France; Lucca, Italy; Brest, Belarus; Abingdon, United Kingdom	Schongau, Germany; Gorinchem, Netherlands; Tábor, Czech Republic; Krško, Slovenia; Tambacounda, Senegal
