= Belsele =

- Town
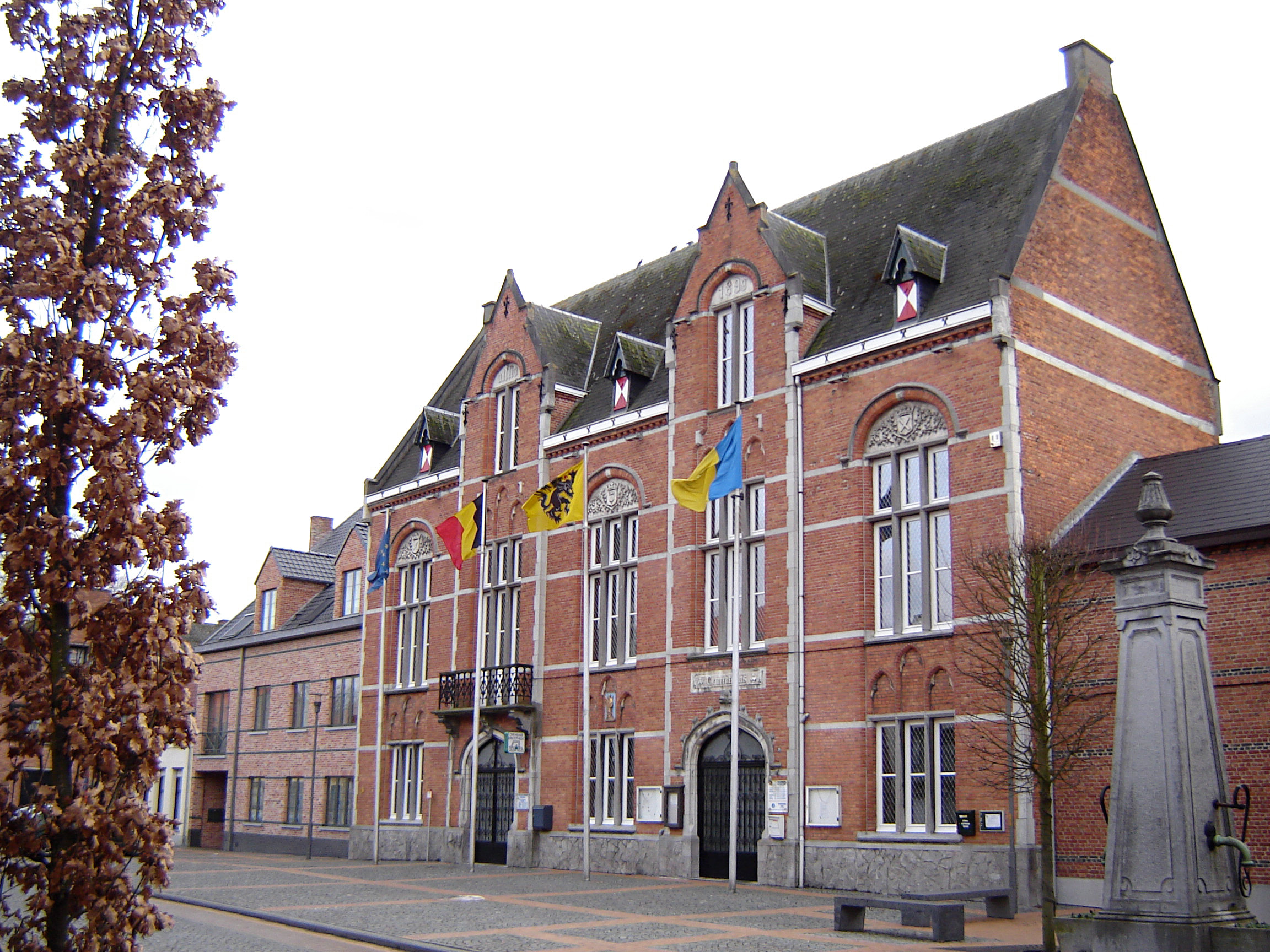
- Former town hall

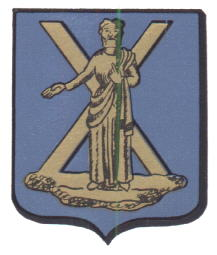
- Seal

- Location in Belgium
- Coordinates: 51°09′N 4°05′E
- Country: Belgium
- Region: Flemish Region
- Province: East Flanders
- Municipality: Sint-Niklaas

Area
  - Total: 19.83 km^{2} (7.66 sq mi)

Population (2021)
  - Total: 10.572
  - Density: 0.5331/km^{2} (1.381/sq mi)
- Time zone: CET

Belsele is a village and a deelgemeente of the municipality of Sint-Niklaas, which is situated in the Belgian province of East Flanders.

== History ==
Around the 2nd or 3rd century CE there stood a Roman villa in Belsele, that was discovered in the 19th century. Other findings (like Roman coins) also suggest there was a Roman presence in Belsele around the 3rd century.

Belsele was first mentioned in 870. In 1217 Belsele became an autonomous parish. In that time Belsele and Sinaai were united in rule in a tribunal (under the Keure van Waas). In 1795, Belsele became canton Capitol of the Scheldt department, with Daknam, Eksaarde, Elversele, Kemzeke, Sinaai, Sint-Pauwels, Tielrode, and Waasmunster as subordinate municipalities. This statute was in force till the Belgian Revolution in 1830.

Until the first half of the twentieth century, Belsele maintained its typical character of a farmers village in the Waas. Production was mainly focused on flax and wheat till 1850. This changed in the twentieth century when the emphasis was put on food, construction, and textile. Since the second world war, Belsele evolved to a green, residential area. Most of the people work in Sint-Niklaas and Antwerp (fewer). The hamlet Puivelde forms a separate entity.

== Gallery ==
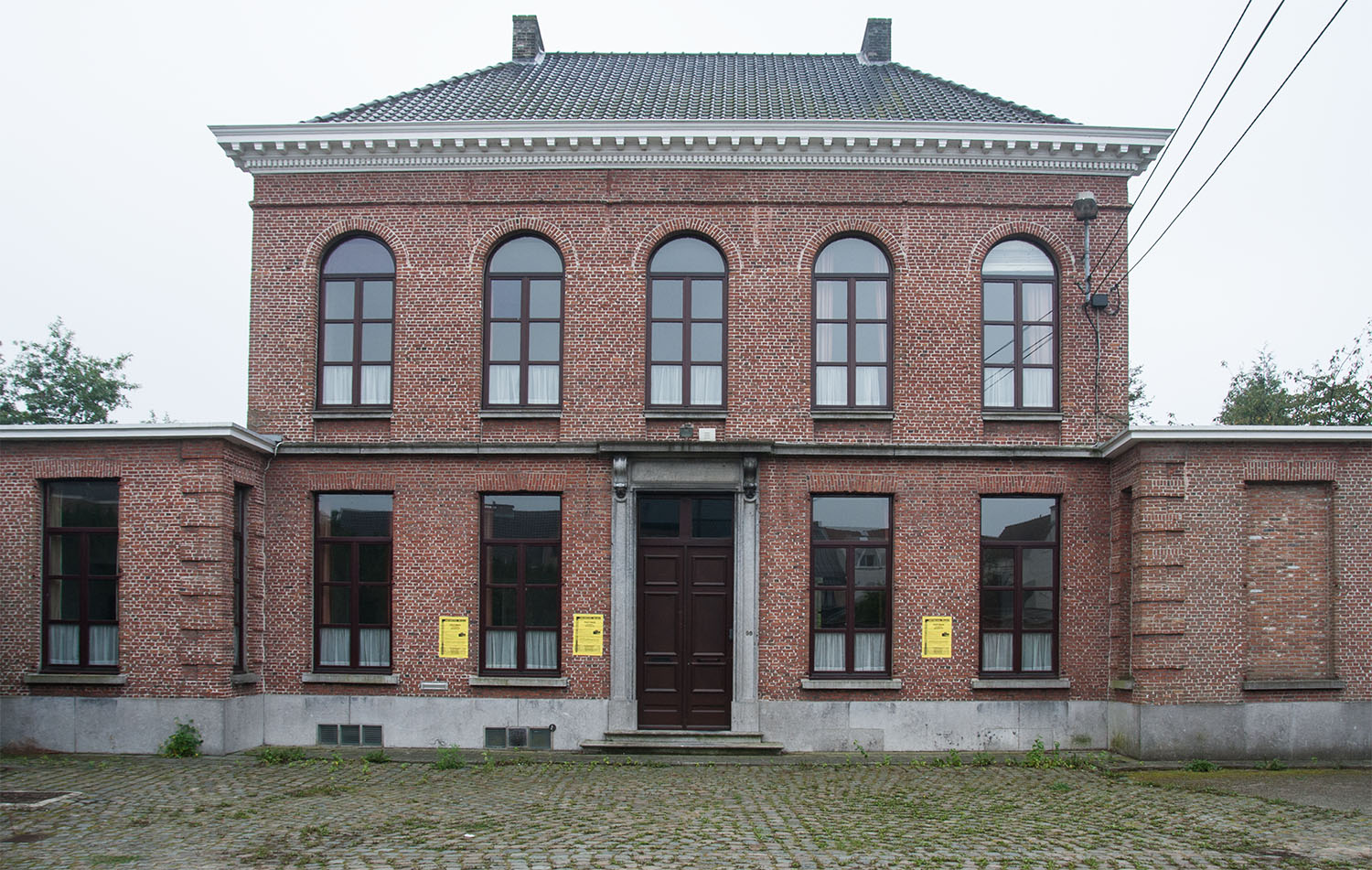
Clergy house

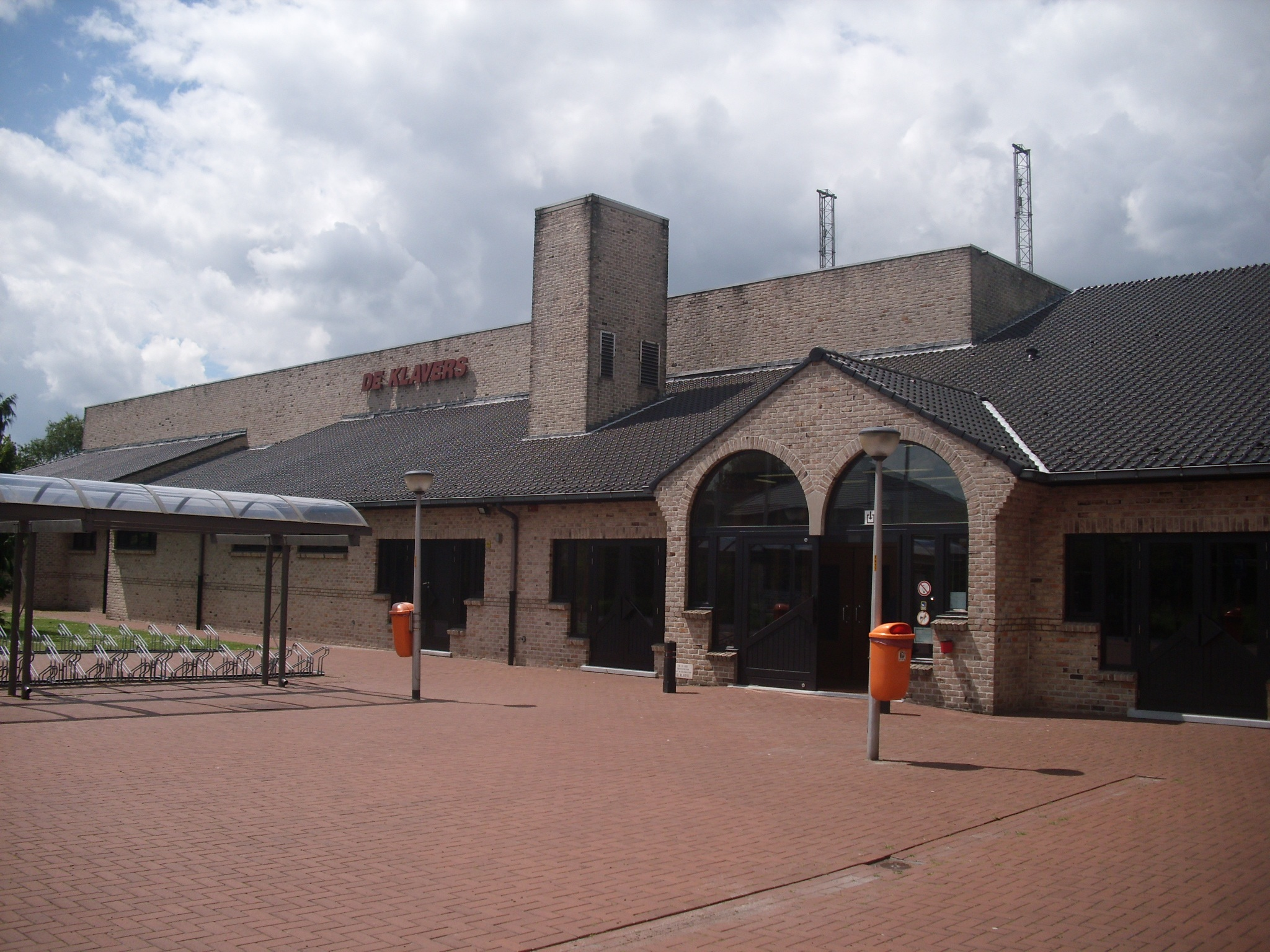
Sport hall De Klavers

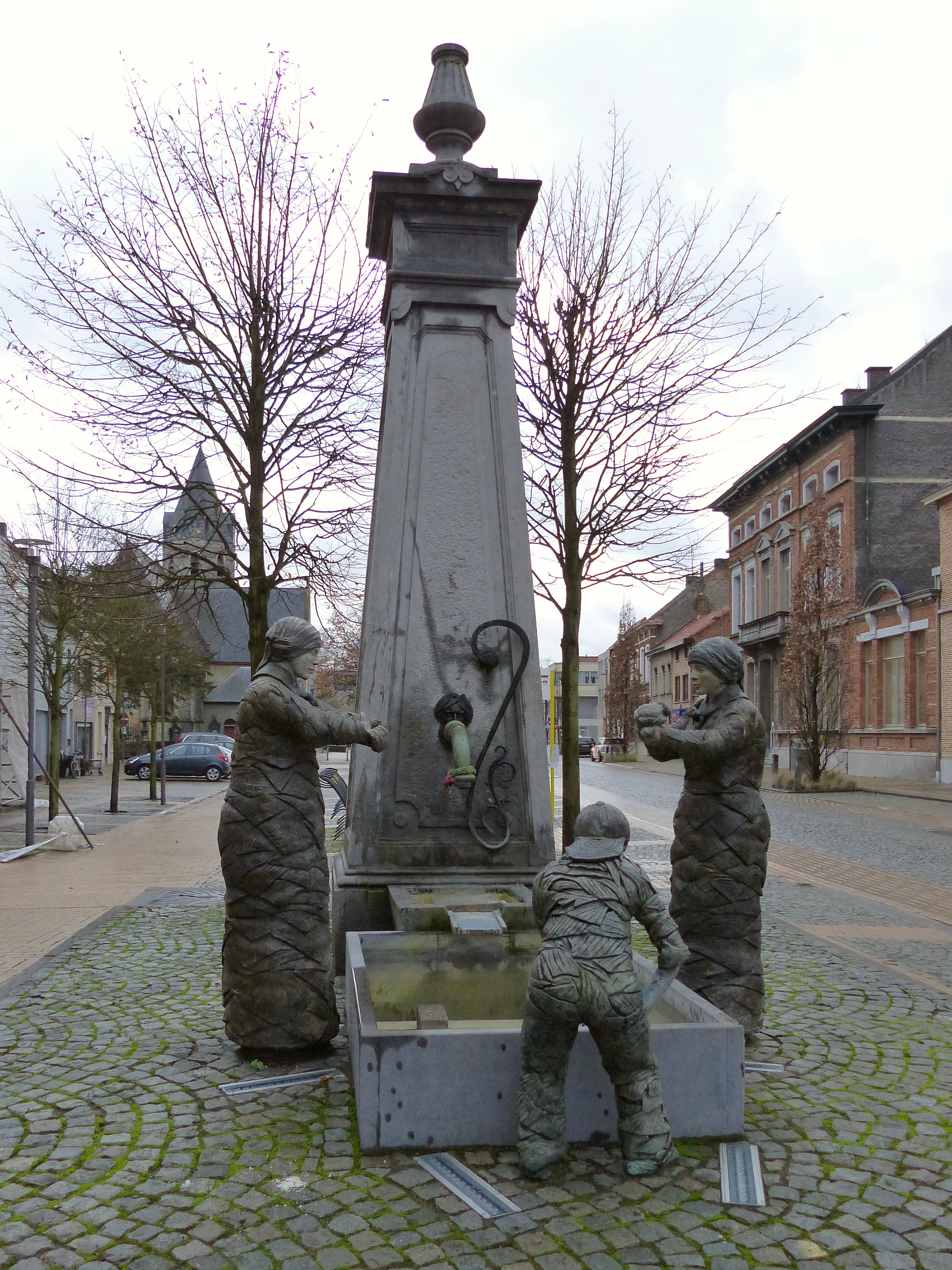
Village pump

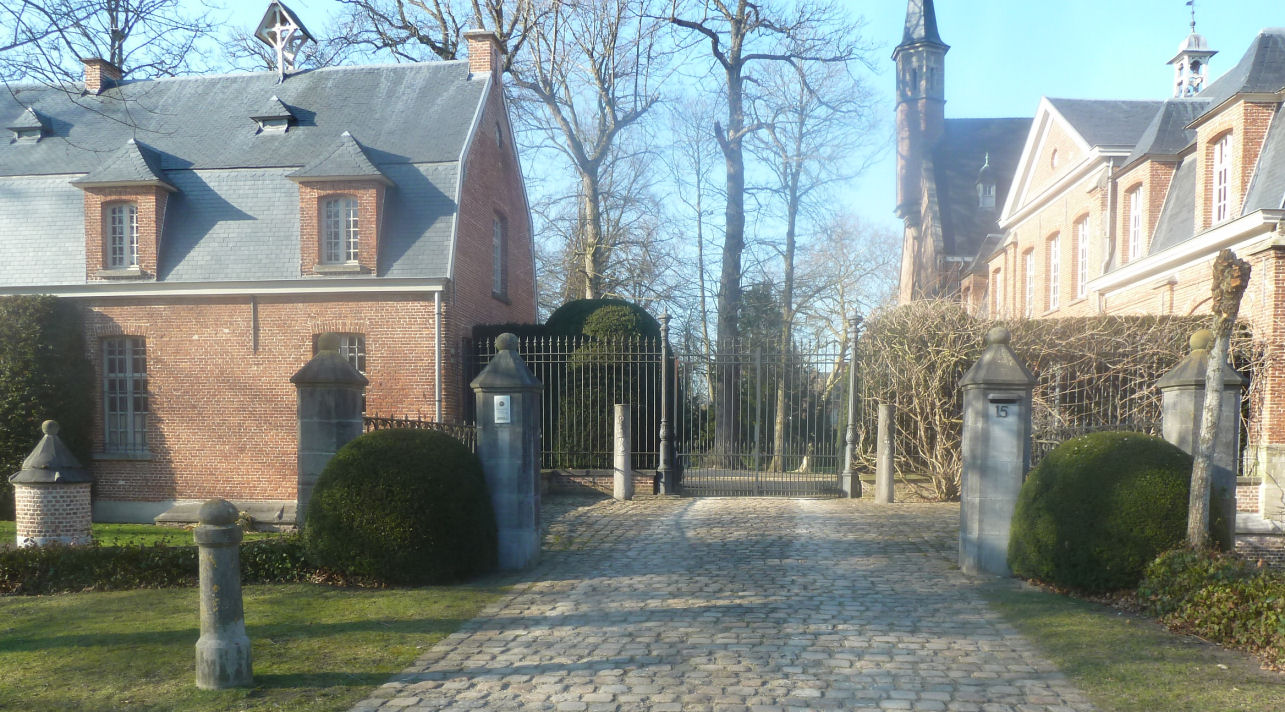
Belsele Castle
