= Walburg Castle =

Castle in Belgium

- Belgium
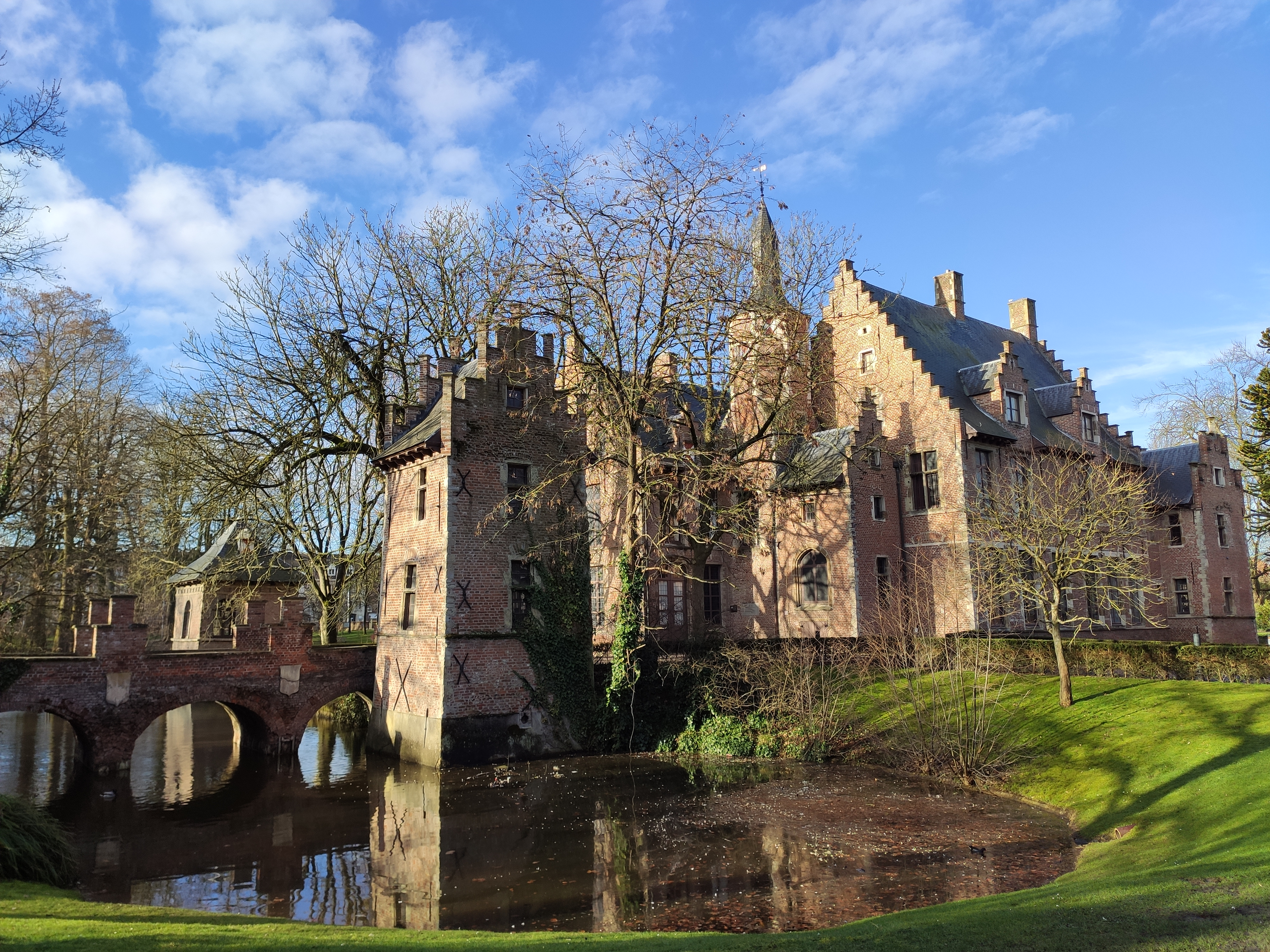

Site information
- Type: Castle

Location
- Coordinates: 51°09′46″N 4°08′46″E

Walburg Castle (Dutch: Kasteel Walburg) is a 16th-century castle in the East Flemish city of Sint-Niklaas.

The castle dates from the 16th century. In 1553 knight Willem van Waelwijck built his moated castle within walking distance of the market. He named his castle after his wife, Walburgis. The former domain consisted of an orchard, a garden and two country roads. The castle changed hands several times and, among other things, it was turned into a brewery in 1618. In the 19th century it came into the hands of the Van Naemen family and the castle was renovated. The park was also converted into an English garden.

The castle was acquired by the municipality in 1949. The park was opened to the public in 1952. After the death of the mayor Romain De Vidts, the park was renamed Romain De Vidtspark.

In 1975 the castle and the park were registered as protected monuments.

== Gallery ==
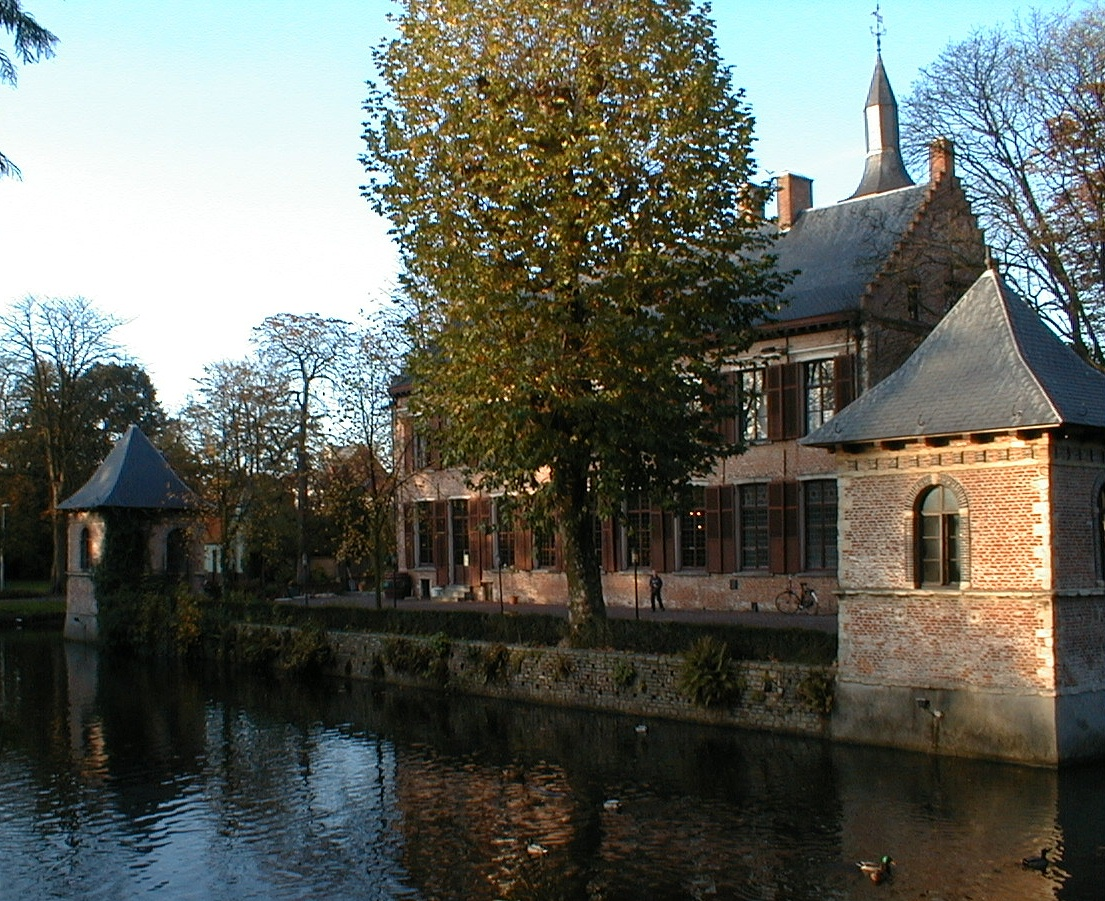
Walburg Castle

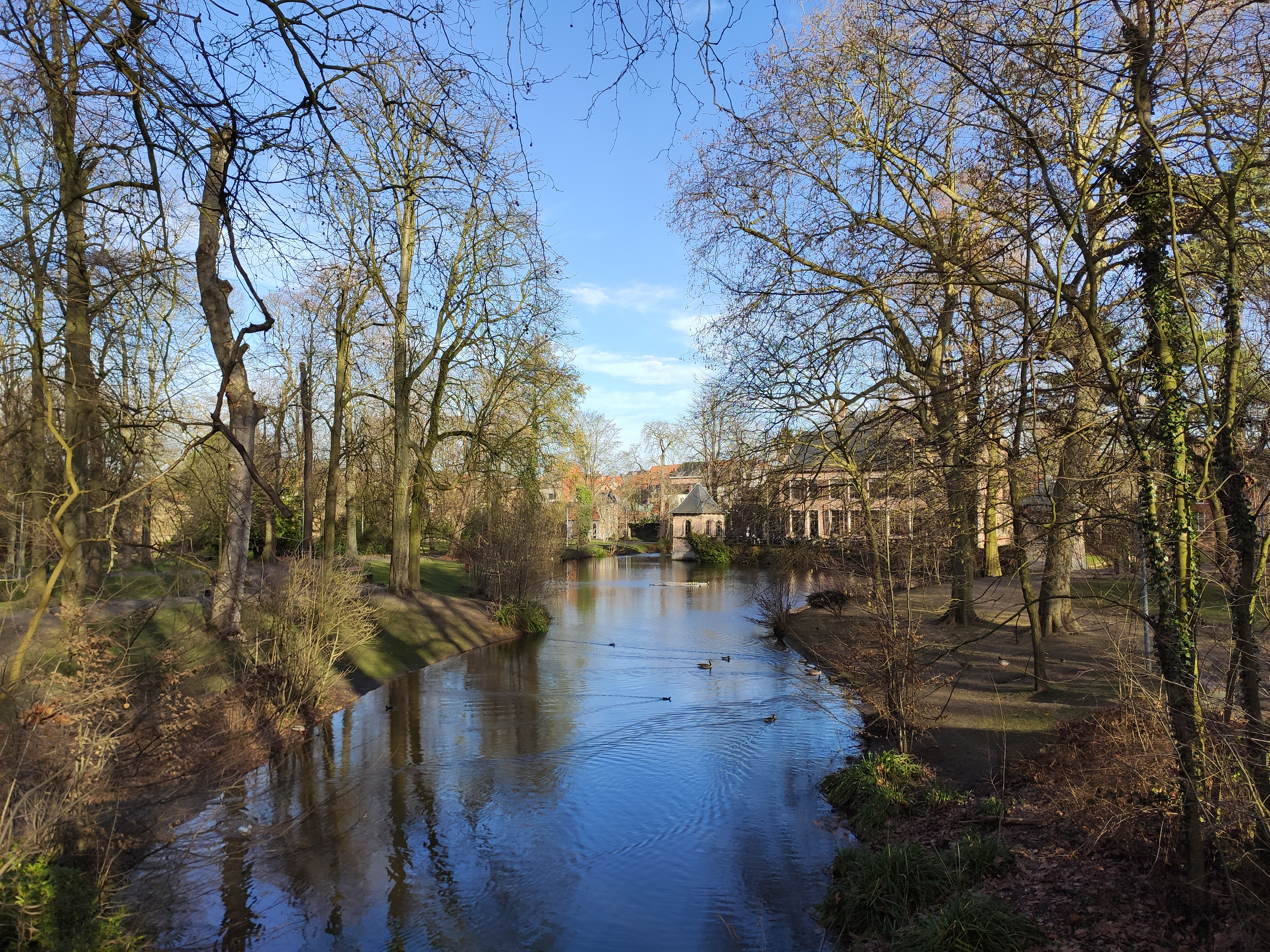
The pond in the Romain De Vidtspark with the castle in the background

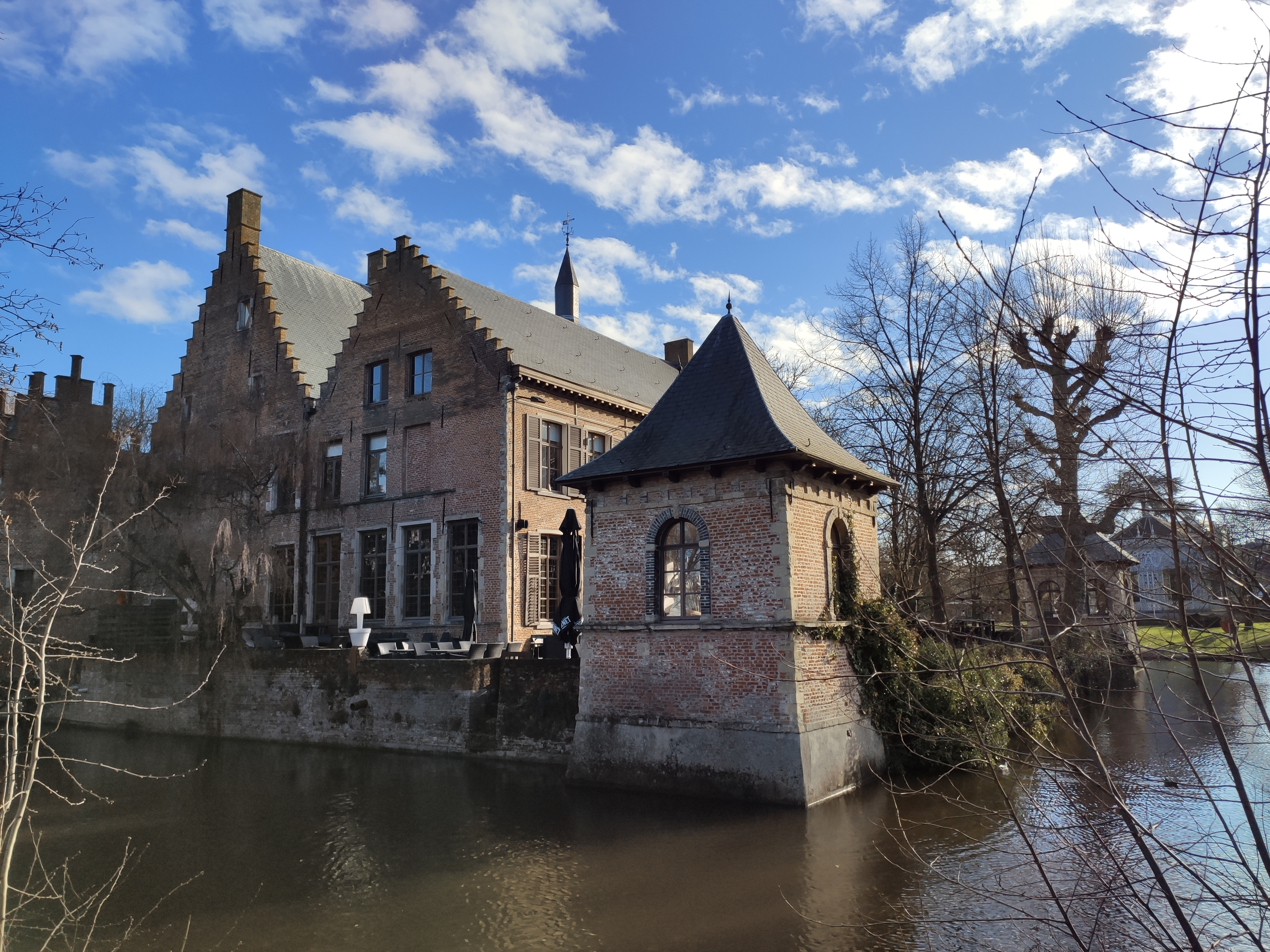
Walburg Castle

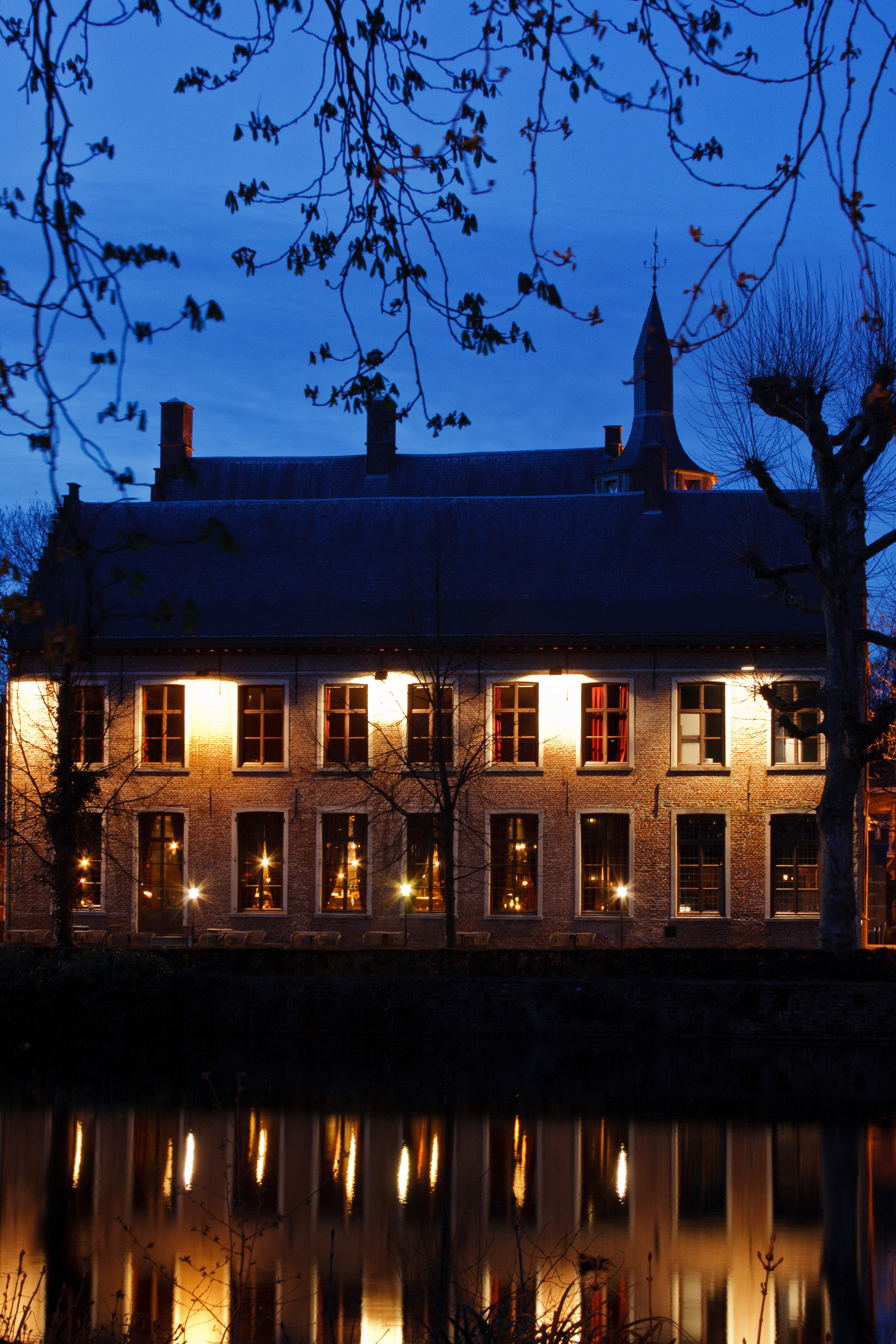
The castle at night
