= Zwijndrecht =

Zwijndrecht may refer to:

- Zwijndrecht, Belgium, a town in Belgium
- Zwijndrecht, Netherlands, a town in the Netherlands
