= Kallo =

Village in East Flanders, Belgium

- Village
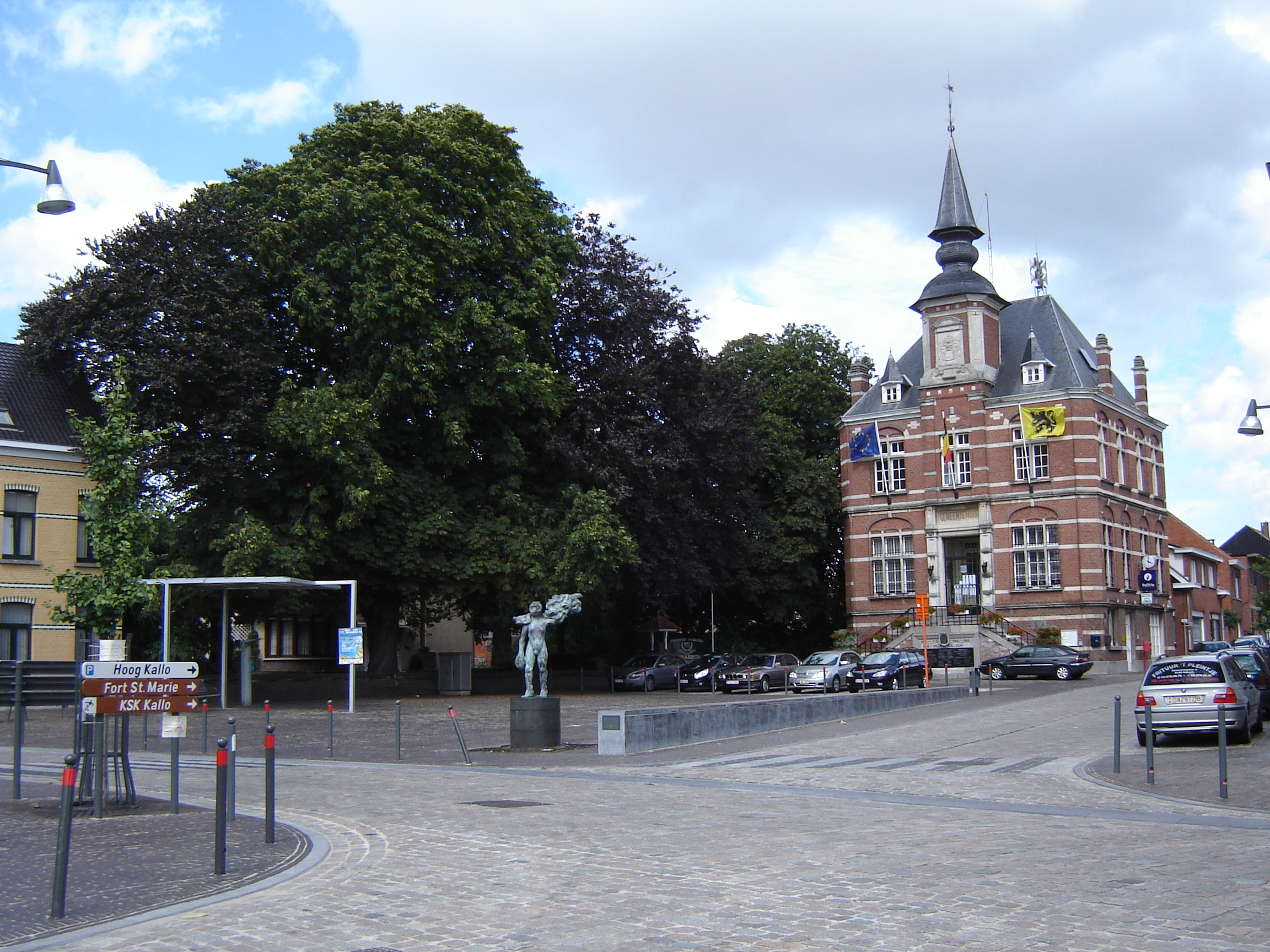
- Square with former town hall

- Seal

- Location in Belgium
- Coordinates: 51.2519°N 4.2783°E
- Country: Belgium
- Region: Flemish Region
- Province: East Flanders
- Municipality: Beveren-Kruibeke-Zwijndrecht

Area
  - Total: 30.16 km^{2} (11.64 sq mi)

Population (2021)
  - Total: 2,442
  - Density: 80.97/km^{2} (209.7/sq mi)
- Time zone: CET

Kallo is a village and deelgemeente (sub-municipality) of Beveren-Kruibeke-Zwijndrecht in East Flanders, Belgium. Kallo was an independent municipality until 1 January 1977, when it merged with Beveren, and then with Kruibeke and Zwijndrecht on 1 January 2025 as part of the fusion of municipalities in Belgium. Most of the deelgemeente consists of harbours and industrial zones.

== History ==
Kallo is one of the oldest settlements of the Waasland. The Frisii used to live on the higher parts which could not be flooded by the Scheldt. According to legend, the inhabitants were christened by Amandus in the 7th century, however the first written evidence of a church dates from 1179.

Kallo was originally a fishing village. In 1316, the village was destroyed and the land was inundated by William III, Count of Holland. In 1583, during the Dutch Revolt, the land was again inundated by Alexander Farnese, Duke of Parma which resulted in a severe decline of the village. The area was repoldered in the 17th century. In 1638, war returned, and the Battle of Kallo was fought between the Dutch and the Spanish.

Kallo was affected by the North Sea flood of 1953. In 1964, an area of 100 square kilometres (39 sq mi) was designated to be used for the construction of the Waaslandhaven, an extension of the Port of Antwerp. The actual harbour which has been constructed is smaller. An area of 50 square kilometres (19 sq mi) was in use in 2020. In 1977, the municipality was merged into Beveren.

== Buildings and sights ==
The St Peter and Paul Church was first attested in 1179. The single aisled church was transformed in a three aisled basilica-like church in 1737, and only the original choir remained. The church was again extended in 1842 and between 1865 and 1869.

Fort Liefkenshoek is one of the oldest extant fortresses of Belgium. It was built in the late 16th century to protect Antwerp and the harbour against the Spanish. Together with Fort Lillo, it allowed the Dutch to block the Scheldt. The forts changed ownership several times, and the last modifications date from the Napoleonic period (1810-1811).

The Organ collection Ghysels is a museum dedicated to mechanical dance and fairground organs. It opened in 2010 in Kallo.

== KSK Kallo ==
KSK Kallo is the football club. Notable players have included Albert Cluytens.

== Gallery ==
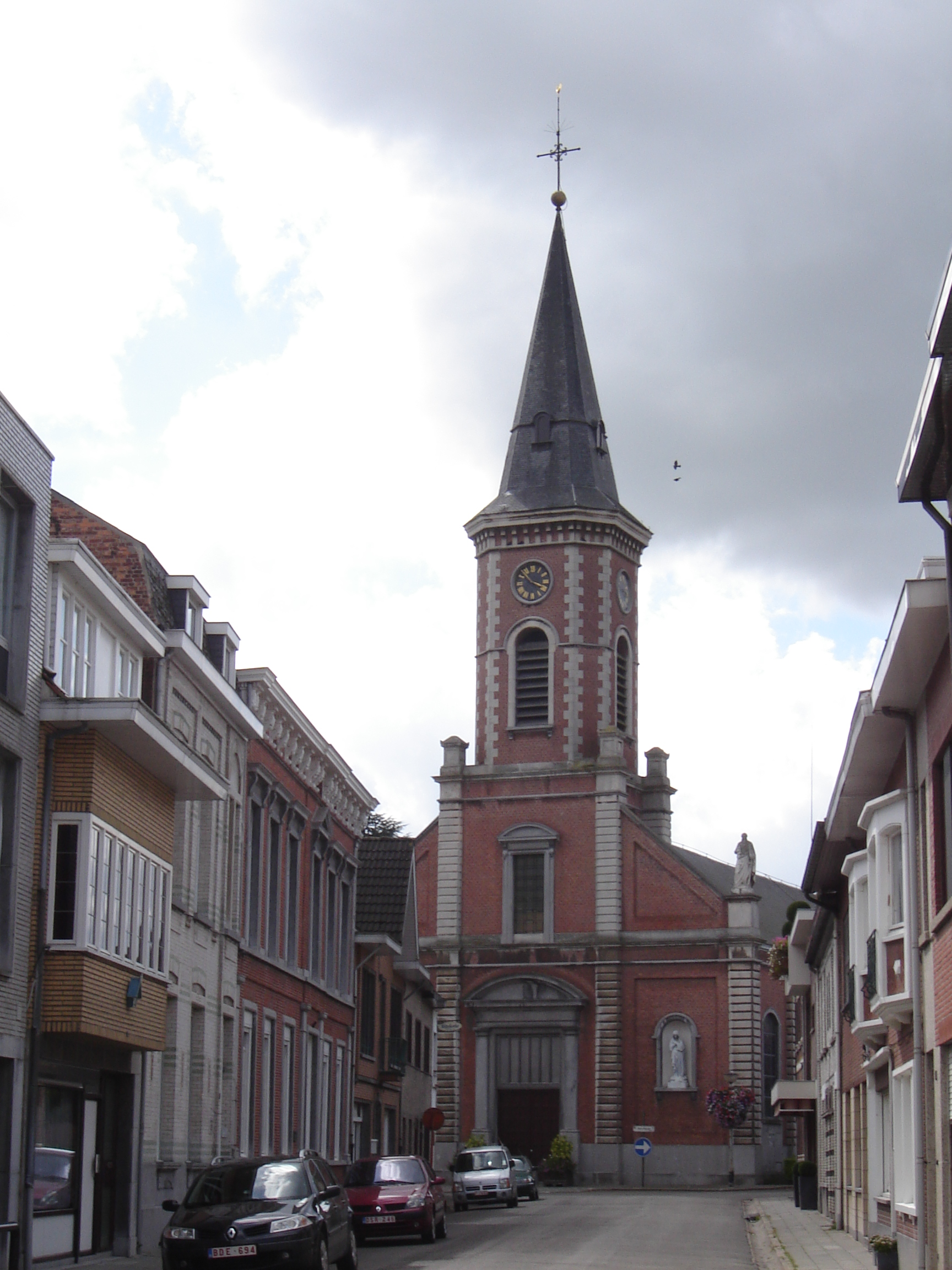
St Peter and Paul Church

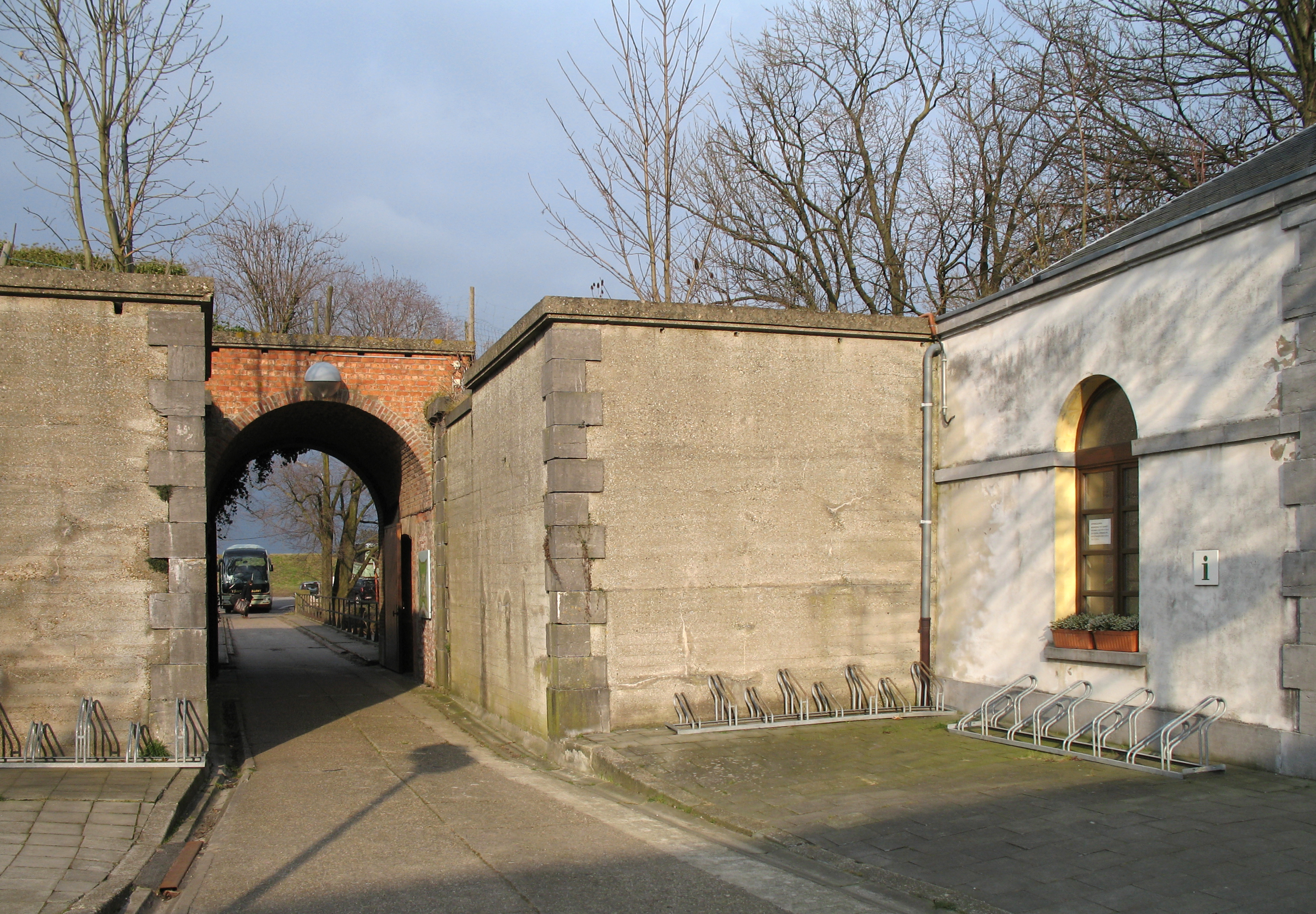
Fort Liefkenshoek

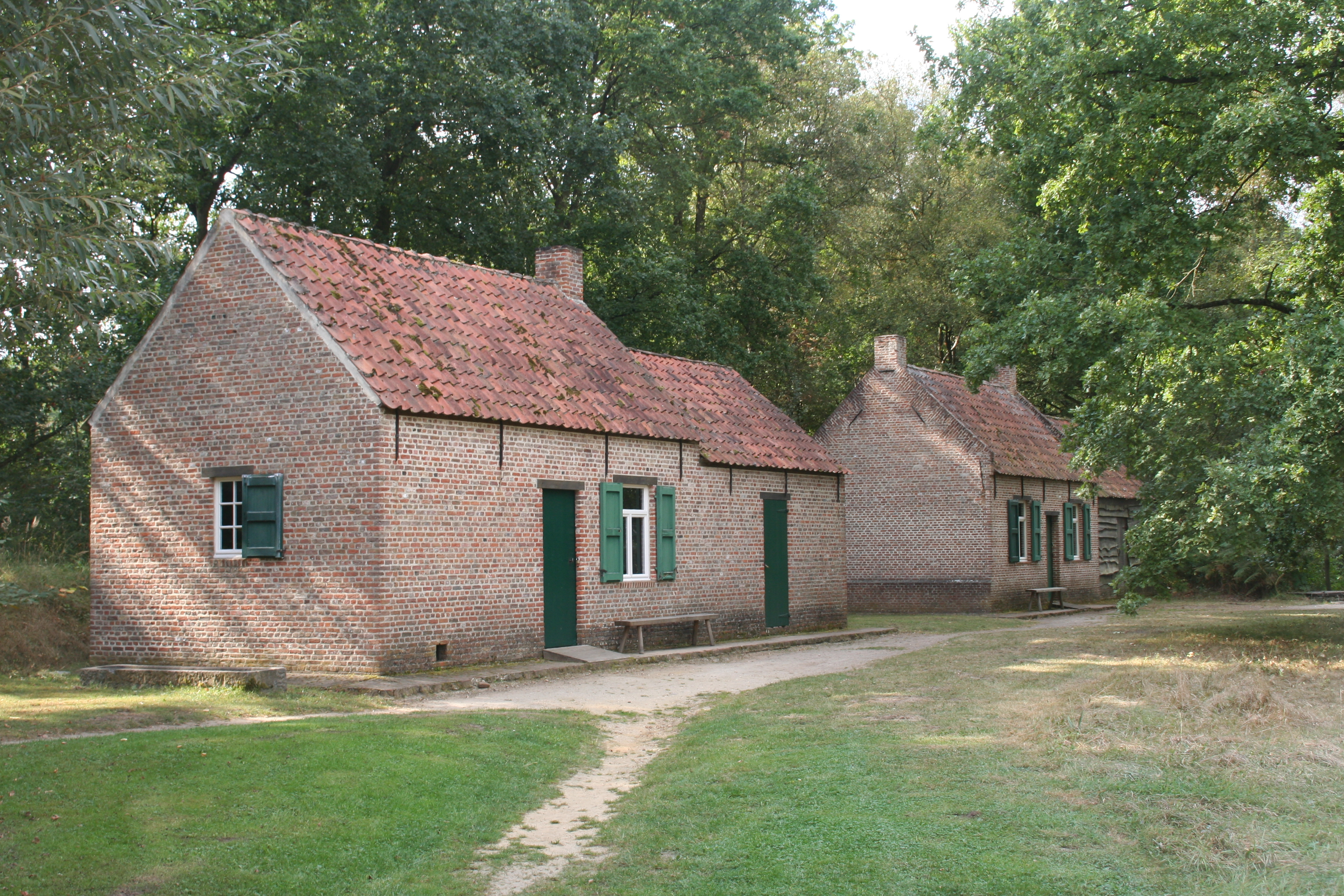
Dike houses in Kallo

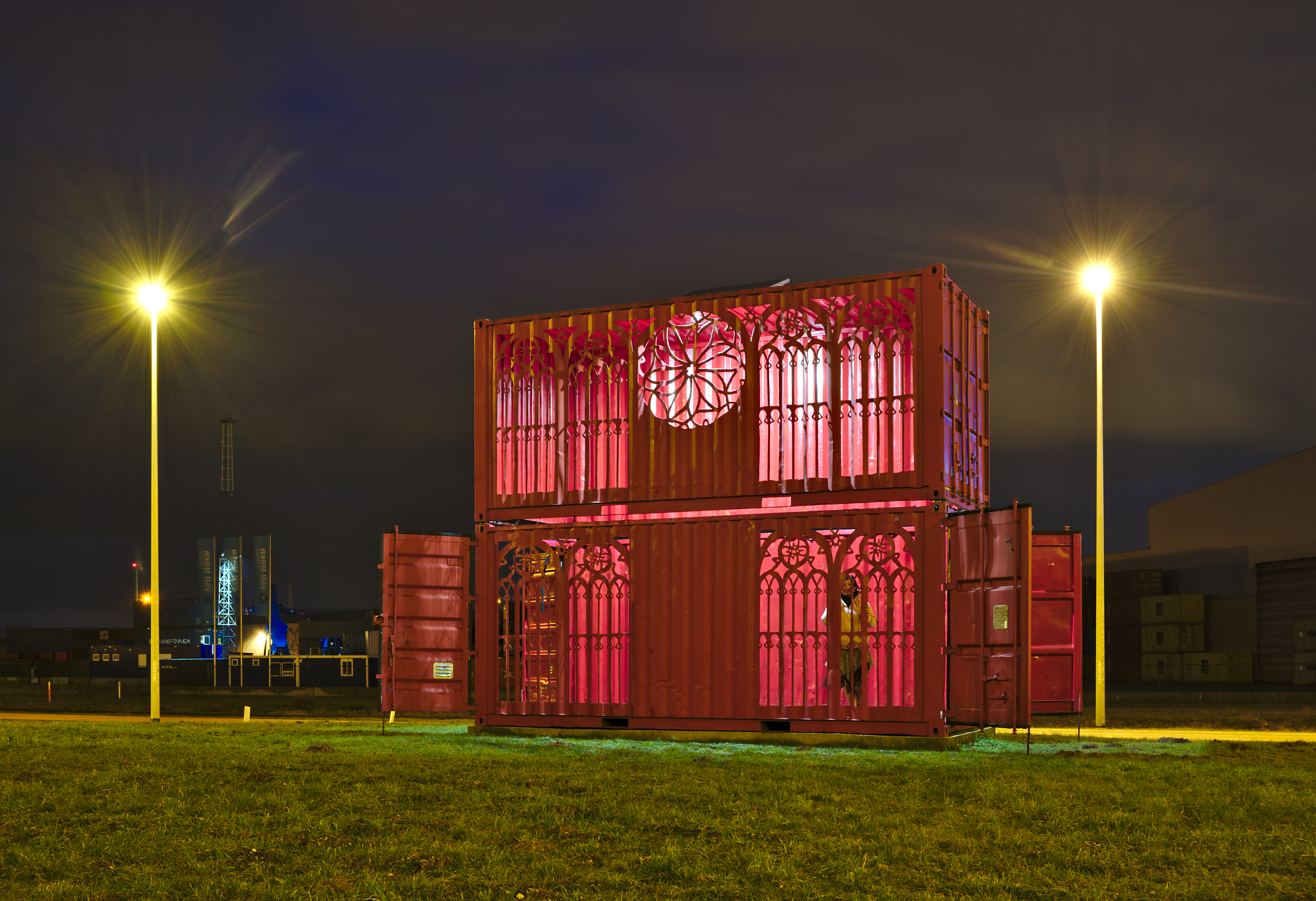
Container art
