= Alvania simonsi =

Scientific classification
- Kingdom: Animalia
- Phylum: Mollusca
- Class: Gastropoda
- Subclass: Caenogastropoda
- Order: Littorinimorpha
- Superfamily: Rissooidea
- Family: Rissoidae
- Genus: Alvania
- Species: †A. simonsi

Binomial name
- †Alvania simonsi Marquet, 1997

Species of gastropod

Alvania simonsi is an extinct species of minute sea snail, a marine gastropod mollusk or micromollusk in the family Rissoidae.

== Distribution ==
Fossils of this marine species were found in Pliocene strata near Kallo, Belgium.
