= Burcht, Antwerp =

Burcht
- Village
- Location in Belgium
- Country: Belgium
- Region: Flemish Region
- Province: East Flanders
- Municipality: Beveren-Kruibeke-Zwijndrecht

Area
  - Total: 4.49 km^{2} (1.73 sq mi)

Population (2021)
  - Total: 7,608
  - Density: 1,690/km^{2} (4,390/sq mi)
- Time zone: CET

Burcht is a village within the municipality of Beveren-Kruibeke-Zwijndrecht located in the Flemish province of East Flanders, in Belgium.

== History ==
=== Origin of the name ===
The name Burcht is derived from the old Germanic word “burgipja” which means “birch”, and probably refers to the type of vegetation that grows abundantly in the sandy ground of the area.

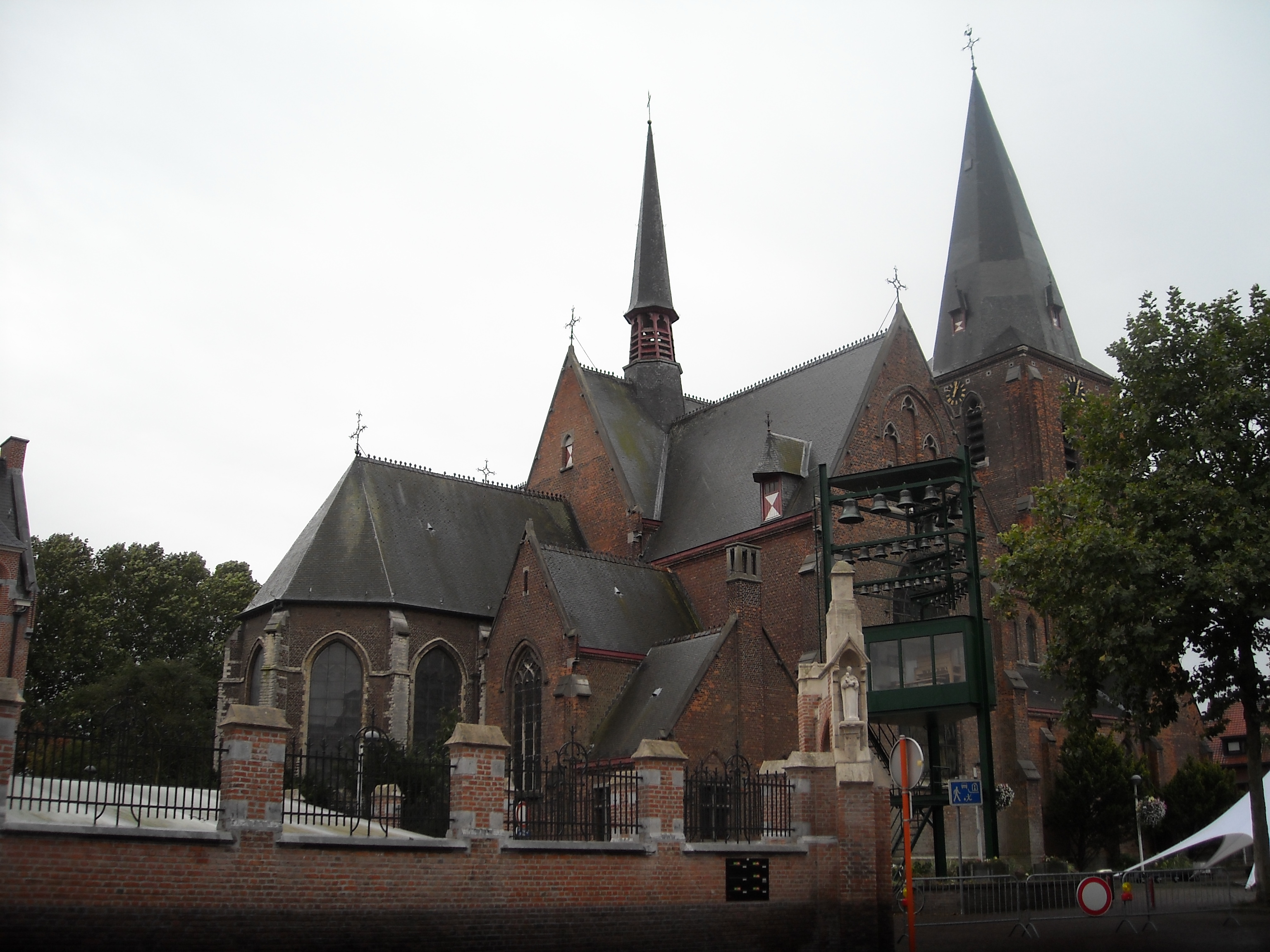
Sint Martinus Church in Burcht. Built in the 15th-16th centuries, with renovations/restorations in the 19th and 20th centuries

=== Early history ===
While very little archaeological excavation has been done in the municipality of Zwijndrecht itself, numerous findings have been documented in the surrounding region, which is referred to as Het Waasland. These have indicated occupation in the area from as early as the end of the Neolithic Period (c. 2200-1800 BC) Numerous indications of Roman occupation have also been uncovered in the Waasland area.

In the early Middle Ages, Zwijndrecht-Burcht was sparsely populated, its landscape consisting mainly of wet woodland and small settlements separated by forests. This situation remained until the latter half of the 11th century, when an increase in population necessitated changes in land use: the forests between settlements were cleared and fields were formed into communal agricultural spaces, using a three-course crop rotation system. These were referred to as “kouters” or ploughshares. Raised paths through the wetlands evolved into dikes, and by the 14th century, polders were in use.

=== Feudal period ===
On 15 April 1281, the Count of Flanders Gwijde van Dampierre granted manorial rights to Nikolaas van Kets, making him Lord of Zwijndrecht and Burcht. The seat of the Lords of Zwijndrecht was a manor house called the Kraaienhof (the ruins of which were demolished in the mid-20th century), which was located in what is now the village of Burcht. The van Kets held the manorial rights until 1445, when Wouter van Kets sold them to Jan Vilain. They passed by inheritance to the van Montmorency family. Due to financial pressures, the heir Filips II de Montmorency, Count of Horne (1524-1568) was forced to sell the title, property and rights to a conglomeration of four cities, Bruges, Ghent, Ypres and the Brugse Vrije, known as the “Vier Leden” (four members). After rebelling against Spanish rule during the Eighty Years War, the Vier Leden were forced to forfeit the property to the Spanish crown in 1585, but it was later returned to them. The dikes and infrastructure were so badly damaged during the hostilities with Spain, that the Vier Leden were forced to loan money for repairs and restoration from Jan van Hove. When the Vier Leden defaulted on the loan, the property, rights and title defaulted to Jan van Hove, making him the new Lord of Zwijndrecht-Burcht. Van Hove held the property until 1621, when the Staten van Vlaanderen (formerly the Vier Leden) was able to pay its debts and reacquire it. After regaining the property, the Staten van Vlaanderen promptly auctioned it off to the highest bidder, an Italian businessman named Jacomo Antonio Carenna, who then became Lord of Zwijndrecht and Burcht. In 1666, he divided the property between his two sons, Jan Francisco Carenna (Zwijndrecht) and Ignacius Carenna (Burcht). Burcht and Zwijndrecht became separate villages and remained so until they were reunited as the municipality of Zwijndrecht in 1977.

For the further history specifically of the village of Zwijndrecht, see the article on Zwijndrecht, Belgium.

Ignacius Carenna loaned money for the restoration of Burcht from Louis Van Colen and Margareta Hellinckx (siblings) in 1694. When Carenna proved unable to repay the loan, the property reverted to Van Colen and Hellinckx, who became co-rulers of Burcht. By inheritance it passed from the Van Colen family to the De Neuf family in 1750. The last Lord of Burcht was Carolus Petrus Josephus de Neuf, who acquired the title in 1779. After the French Revolution, all feudal titles and rights were dissolved.

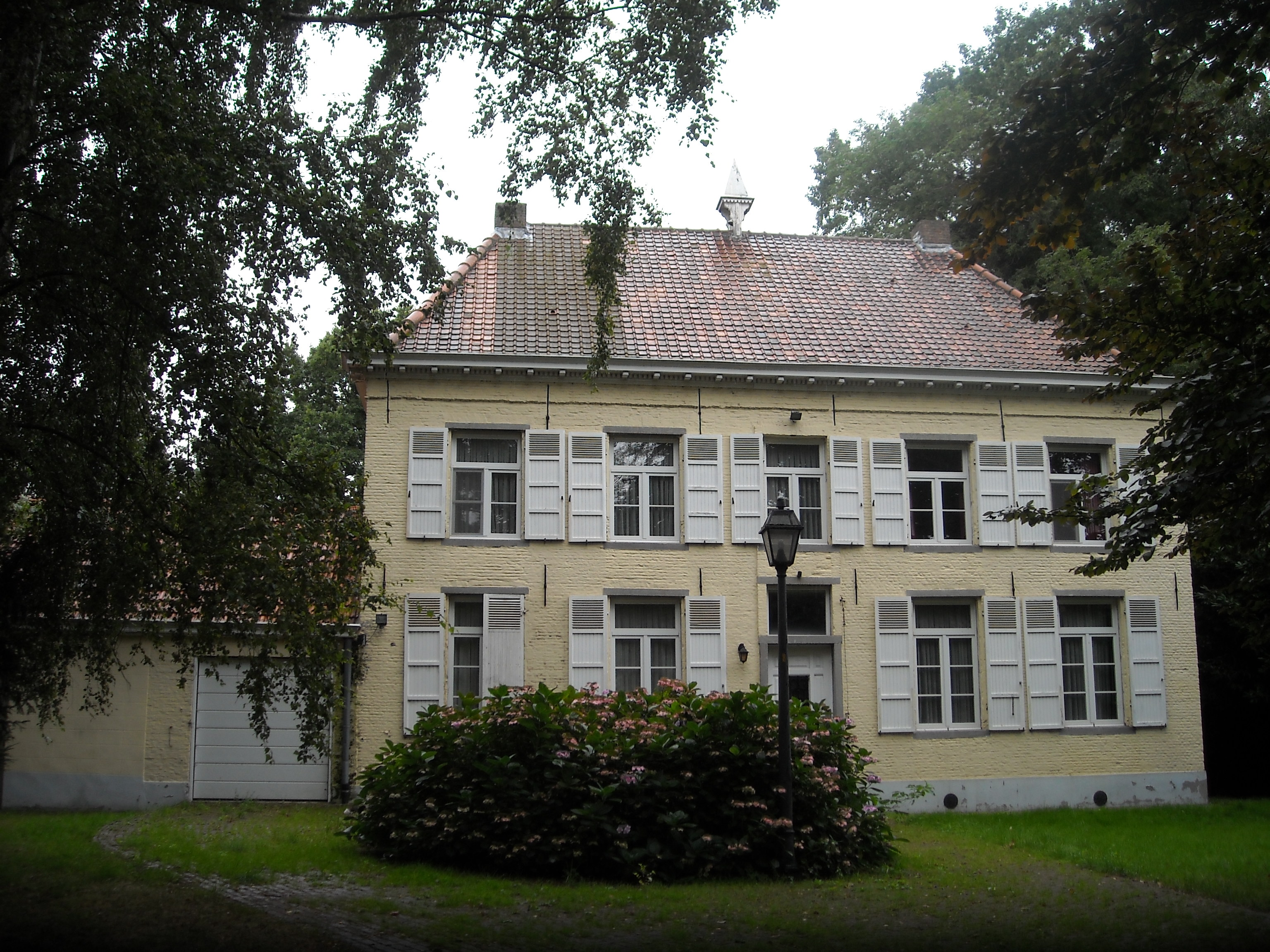
Rectory, built in 1659

=== Industrialization: the nineteenth and twentieth centuries ===
Geographically and historically, Burcht was originally part of the province of East Flanders, which fell under the jurisdiction of the Count of Flanders. However, in 1923, the village was transferred to the Province of Antwerp. Burcht was primarily agrarian, but by the middle of the nineteenth century, it had become the site of heavy industry. The fertile land in Borgerweert (part of Burcht) was filled in with dredged slurry from the river Scheldt to accommodate the building of factories. Among the industries established there at the time were a guano factory, a linoleum factory, a cement factory, a pot and pan factory, and a lard processing plant. It is currently the seat of the Ytong plant, which manufactures building blocks. The Lt. Thoumsin military base, which houses the 11th Battalion of Engineers of the Belgian army, is also located in Burcht.

=== World wars ===
During World War I, Burcht and its two forts were part of the Belgian defensive line. By 1914, the villages of Burcht and Zwijndrecht were full of Belgian soldiers, and orders were issued to reinforce the Fort of Zwijndrecht and the Fort of Kruibeke. A number of houses were blown up to clear the way to the forts. Local civilian residents were recruited for the reinforcement work, soldiers were quartered in private homes and factories, farmers were required to loan their horses and carts for military use, and food and goods were confiscated for the military. In spite of all efforts, Belgium fell to the Germans in October 1914 and Burcht, like all the German-occupied communities in Belgium, suffered greatly for the next four years from food shortages. By the end of the war, 80 young people from Zwijndrecht and Burcht had perished on the front. 82 civilian unemployed civilians from Burcht as well as 99 non-unemployed citizens had been deported to Germany as forced labor. In addition, 5 civilians were deported to Germany for political reasons. A total of 8 citizens from Burcht lost their lives as a result of these deportations.

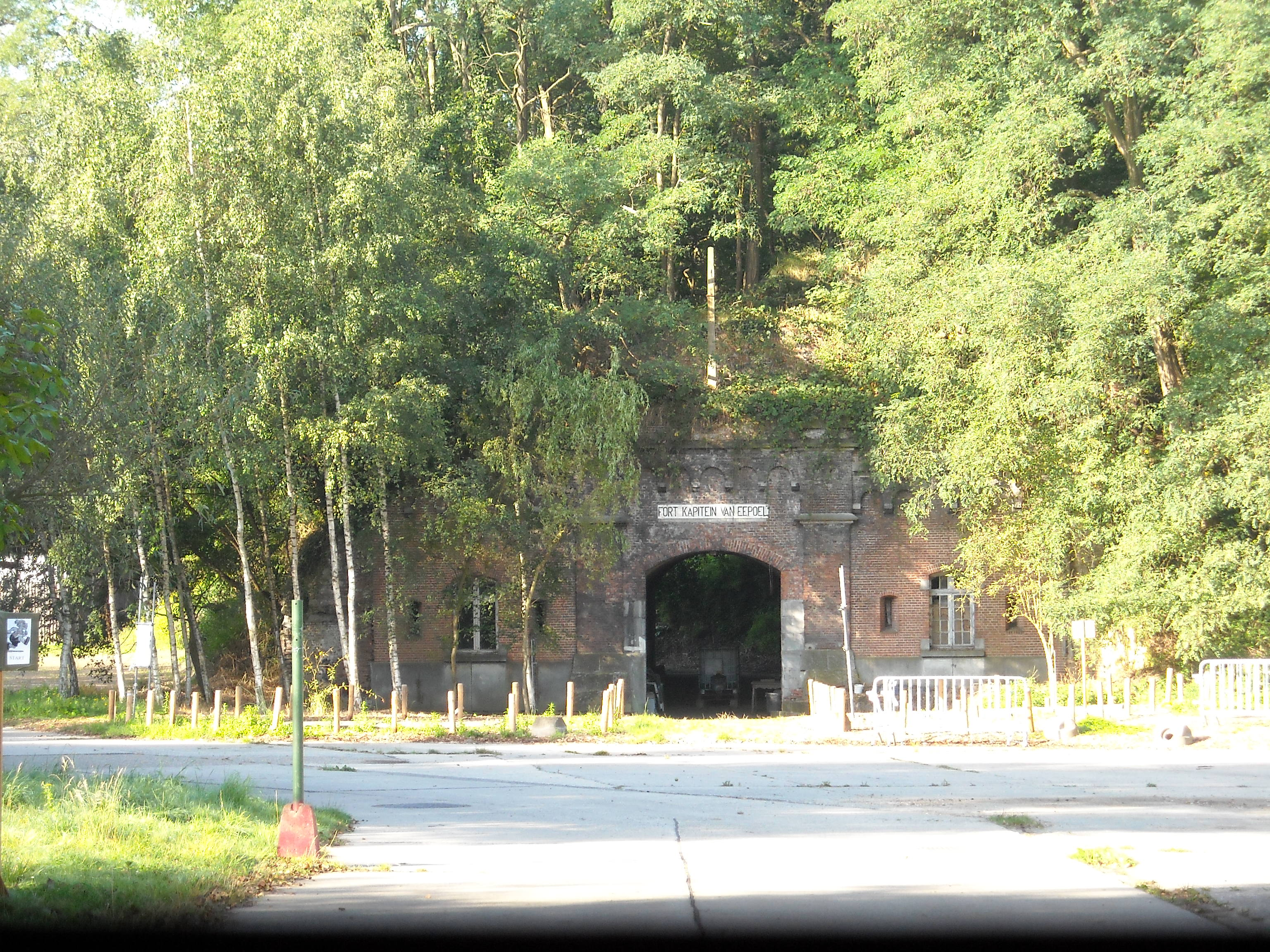
Fort of Kruibeke in Burcht, built in 1870 as part of the national redoubt of Belgium.

By 1939, Zwindrecht and Burcht were once again preparing for war with Germany. On 18 May 1940, the Swastika flag had already been raised on the Antwerp Cathedral. Although retreating Belgian troops attempted to blow up the two tunnels leading to the left bank of the Scheldt to prevent the Germans from crossing easily, the explosives in the pedestrian tunnel failed to detonate completely, allowing the German troops to cross the river. During the resulting battle on the streets of Zwijndrecht, 16 German and 29 Belgian soldiers lost their lives, in addition to 32 civilians. Of the latter, 2 were from Burcht

After years of Nazi occupation, the British army liberated Antwerp in September 1944. In an attempt to prevent the Allies from being able to use the Port of Antwerp, the Germans bombarded the harbor with V-1 and V-2 rockets. However, most of the rockets missed their intended target (the port) and fell instead in the surrounding areas, including Burcht. A total of 76 V-bombs fell on Zwijndrecht-Burcht between 25 October 1944 and 28 March 1945. In Burcht, 14 citizens were killed. 50 houses were destroyed completely, and more than 250 houses were badly damaged.

Burcht remained a separate village with its own mayor and administration from the 17th century until the end of the 20th century. In 1977, during an administrative reorganization of the Flemish provinces, Burcht was once again merged with Zwijndrecht under the municipality of Zwijndrecht.

== Notable residents ==
- Gia Baldi (stage name of Maria Lea Joos), b. 1936 in Burcht. Opera singer.
- Fred Bervoets, b. 1942 in Burcht. Painter and graphic artist.
- Nico Van Dyck, b. 1970 in Antwerp. Footballer and President of FC Lunatics
