= St Joris Gate =

Former city gate of Antwerp, Belgium

St. Joris Gate
- Sint-Jorispoort
- Part of Fortifications of Antwerp
- Antwerp, Belgium in Belgium

Site information
- Type: City gate
- Controlled by: City of Antwerp
- Open to the public: No
- Condition: Demolished

Location
- Coordinates: 51.21261°N 4.40716°E

Site history
- Built: 1250
- Built for: City of Antwerp
- Built by: City of Antwerp
- In use: 1865
- Materials: Stone
- Fate: Demolished during 19th-century urban renewal

St. Joris Gate was a historic city gate in Antwerp, Belgium. It formed part of the Fortifications of Antwerp and stood near the modern intersection of Kasteelpleinstraat and Leopoldstraat. Named after Saint George (Sint-Joris), the gate was a key southern entryway toward Mechelen and Brussels.

== History ==
The gate was first built in the 13th century, during a period of urban expansion when Antwerp fortified itself with stone walls and controlled access points. It was reconstructed several times, notably in the 16th and 17th centuries, reflecting Renaissance and early modern military architecture under Spanish rule.

By the 19th century, city walls had become obsolete. Under Mayor Leopold De Wael, Antwerp embarked on modernization and the old fortifications were dismantled to make way for new boulevards and neighborhoods. The St. Joris Gate was demolished during this redevelopment phase.

== Architecture ==
The St. Joris Gate had an arched entrance flanked by defensive towers and decorative stonework. Like other city gates, it likely featured a portcullis, drawbridge, and iconography of Saint George slaying the dragon—symbolic of civic protection.

== Legacy ==
Although the gate no longer exists, its name survives in the nearby street Sint-Jorispoort. The site of the former gate was renamed Leopoldplaats in the 19th century as part of a broader urban redevelopment program following the demolition of the city walls and gates. This transformation turned the old defensive ring into wide, tree-lined boulevards known as the Leien.

The area became a focal point of civic renewal, marked by the construction of important public buildings. One of the most prominent is the National Bank of Belgium branch, built in 1878–1881 on the site of the former gate. The gate itself remains a symbolic part of Antwerp’s medieval urban identity, though no visible traces remain.

== See also ==
- Fortifications of Antwerp
- History of Antwerp
- City gate
