= Organ collection Ghysels =

- Orgelcollectie Ghysels
- Location within Belgium
- Location: Kallo, Beveren
- Coordinates: 51°16′15.44″N 4°17′57.455″E
- Type: Musical instrument museum
- Collections: mechanical dance and fairground organs
- Curator: Museum Vleeshuis
- Owner: Flemish Community

The Organ collection Ghysels is a museum collection of mechanical dance and fairground organs. Since 2010 it is exhibited at the Kijk- en Luisterdepot (Watch and Listen Depot) in Kallo in Beveren, Belgium. It was brought together by Jef Ghysels from Schaerbeek. Great part of the organs operated before the First World War.

== Overview ==
The collection consists of four large historical organs and twelve smaller ones, a number of organ statues, books and documentation material. The oldest organ is L'Hermione from Genoa that dates from 1895. The youngest piece is the Brusilia; commissioned by Ghysels it was built in 1976. The organs in the collection were operated at parties, dance events, year fairs, and on the streets.

The collection was bought by the Flemish Community in 2007. The first exhibition was held from October 2008 to March 2009 in the Art & History Museum in Brussels, where the ball room Continental Superstar was specially created.

In 2010 it was transferred to the Kijk en Luisterdepot (Watch and Listen Depot) in Kallo, near to Antwerp. Here the instruments are stored under acclimatised conditions at Katoen Natie. Guided tours are given here in which is clarified the history of dance and fair culture at the beginning of the 20th century.

In 2013 the collection was allocated to Museum Vleeshuis. The collection still remains in Kallo until Vleeshuis has been renovated.

== See also ==
- List of museums in Belgium
- List of music museums
