= Vleeshuis =

Museum and former guildhall in Antwerp, Belgium

Coordinates: 51.2227°N 4.3992°E

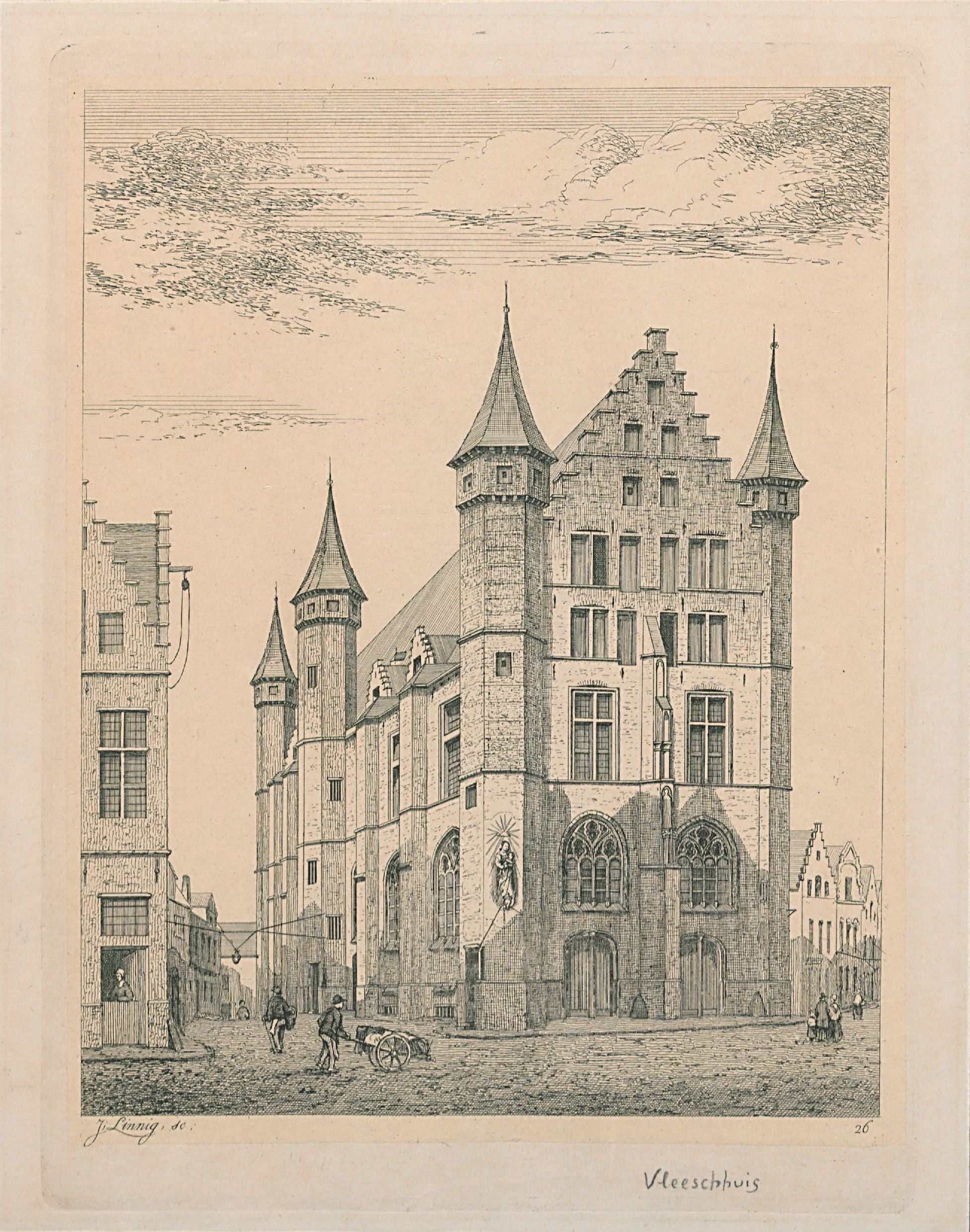
The Vleeshuis by Jozef Linnig, before 1886

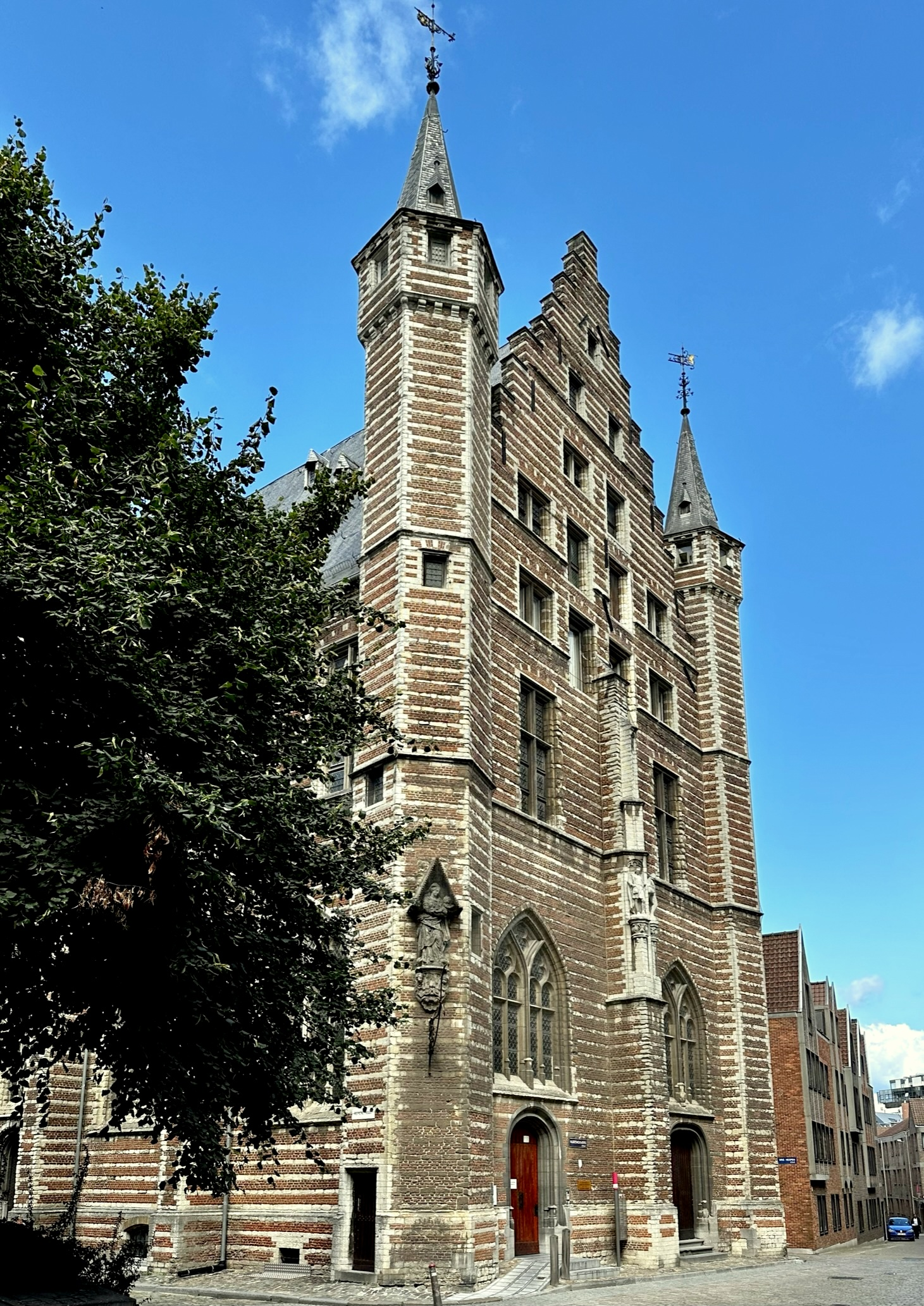
Vleeshuis in 2023

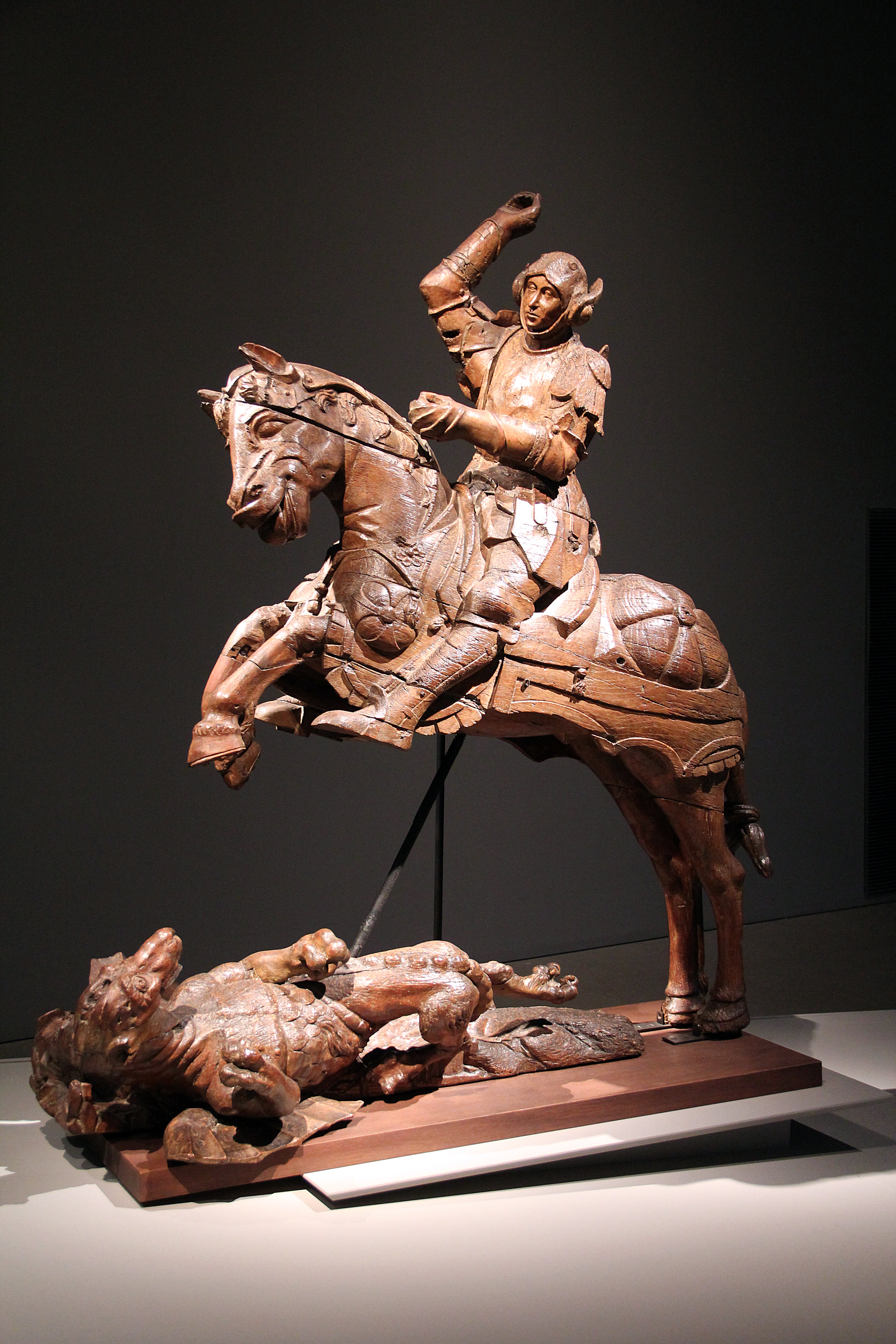
Carved oak group representing Saint George fighting the dragon (ca. 1514).

The Vleeshuis (Butcher's Hall, or literally Meat House) in Antwerp, Belgium, is a former guildhall. It is now a museum located between the Drie Hespenstraat, the Repenstraat and the Vleeshouwersstraat. The slope where the Drie Hespenstraat meets the Burchtgracht used to be known as the Bloedberg or Blood Mountain.

== History ==
In the Middle Ages, Antwerp was one of the economic centers of Flanders, next to Bruges and Ghent. Because of that, indoor trade markets were founded, one of which was the Vleeshuis. It is not known when the first one was built. The second Vleeshuis was built in 1250 near the castle of Antwerp. It was commissioned by the Duke of Brabant and paid for by the city of Antwerp. A central meat market enabled the city to regulate the meat industry, limiting the number of butchers permitted to sell to 52. The building may have also functioned as a slaughterhouse. In 1290, John I, Duke of Brabant recognized the guild of Antwerp butchers, resulting in butchers' guild being the oldest trade guild in Antwerp. In time, many of the butcher families became wealthy. The Vleeshuis functioned as a commercial center for selling slaughtered animals.

== The current structure ==
By 1500 the building had become too small and very neglected. The Butchers Guild decided to build a new Vleeshuis near the cattle market, where the animals were slaughtered and cut. The new building provided room for 62 butchers, plus meeting rooms and storage. It is probable that the current structure was designed by the architect Herman de Waghemakere and his son Domien de Waghemakere.

The current Late-Gothic building was constructed between 1501 and 1504 and is the third Vleeshuis on the site. It is made of red brick and white sandstone. Though the great hall of its interior bears a resemblance to a church, the stairwell towers and crow-stepped gables make it clear this was intended as a secular institution. The interior is divided into two halves, each with a span of 7.5 metres (24 ft 7 in)—the maximum length of a structural oak beam. The bricks were fired onsite using clay from the Rupel district. The sandstone came from quarries at Balegem; interspersed with the bricks created a brickwork known as "bacon layers." Additional finishes were Gobertange limestone for carvings, bluestone for doorways and staircase, and slate for the roof.

In 1796, during the French occupation, the guilds were abolished, and three years later the building was sold. The butchers eventually repurchased it but operations continued on a smaller scale. The additional space was rented out. The guild eventually sold the building in 1841 to the winemaker Peyrot. Peyrot did not need all the space so he divided the interior into a storage area, and a theatre auditorium, often used by the Liefde en Eendragt. Painters used the studios on the upper floors, including Nicaise de Keyser and Gustave Wappers. Organ builder Joseph Delhaye may have also had a studio in the building.

== 20th century ==
In 1899 the Antwerp city council purchased the building for a home for the municipal archives. As it was undergoing restoration by the architect Alexis Van Mechelen, the Provincial Commission for Monument Conservation decided to re-purpose the building as a Museum of Antiquities. (The Museum of Antiquities had been housed in the medieval castle of Het Steen since 1864.) Renovation was completed and the Vleeshuis opened as a museum in 1913, containing some 80,000 objects. One of the oldest collections in Antwerp, the museum sought to display a broad variety of arts works ranging from antiquity to the present. Its collection included metals, ceramics, iconography, architecture and musical instruments.

Beginning in the 1970s, the musical instruments became a more prominent part of the Vleeshuis collection, in part due to the trend of restoring keyboard instruments so that they would be able to be used in performance. Gradually the museum altered its permanent exhibition to focus on musical instruments. After a brief closure, in 2006 the Vleeshuis reopened as Museum Vleeshuis | Klank van de stad (Vleeshuis | Sound of the City) (Muziekmuseum Vleeshuis/Music Museum Vleeshuis as of 2026). Currently the museum focuses on sound, music and dance in Antwerp with displays of instruments, music books, music manuscripts, paintings and models, covering the story of minstrels, bell ringers, opera singers, church and domestic music, public concerts and dance after 1800. The lower-level houses a reconstruction of a bell foundry and the Van Engelen workshop, a studio for the making of brass instruments. During the summer the Vleeshuis organizes carillon concerts in the Cathedral of Our Lady. In September 2024 the museum closed its doors for extensive renovations to the building. The monument will be restored and all floors will be made accessible for visitors.

In 2013 the Organ collection Ghysels was allocated to Vleeshuis. The collection is being stored under climate controlled conditions in Kallo until Vleeshuis has been renovated.

== See also ==
- List of music museums

== Sources ==
- Museum Vleeshuis—Klank van de Stad, Antwerp: BAI, 2009

== Gallery ==
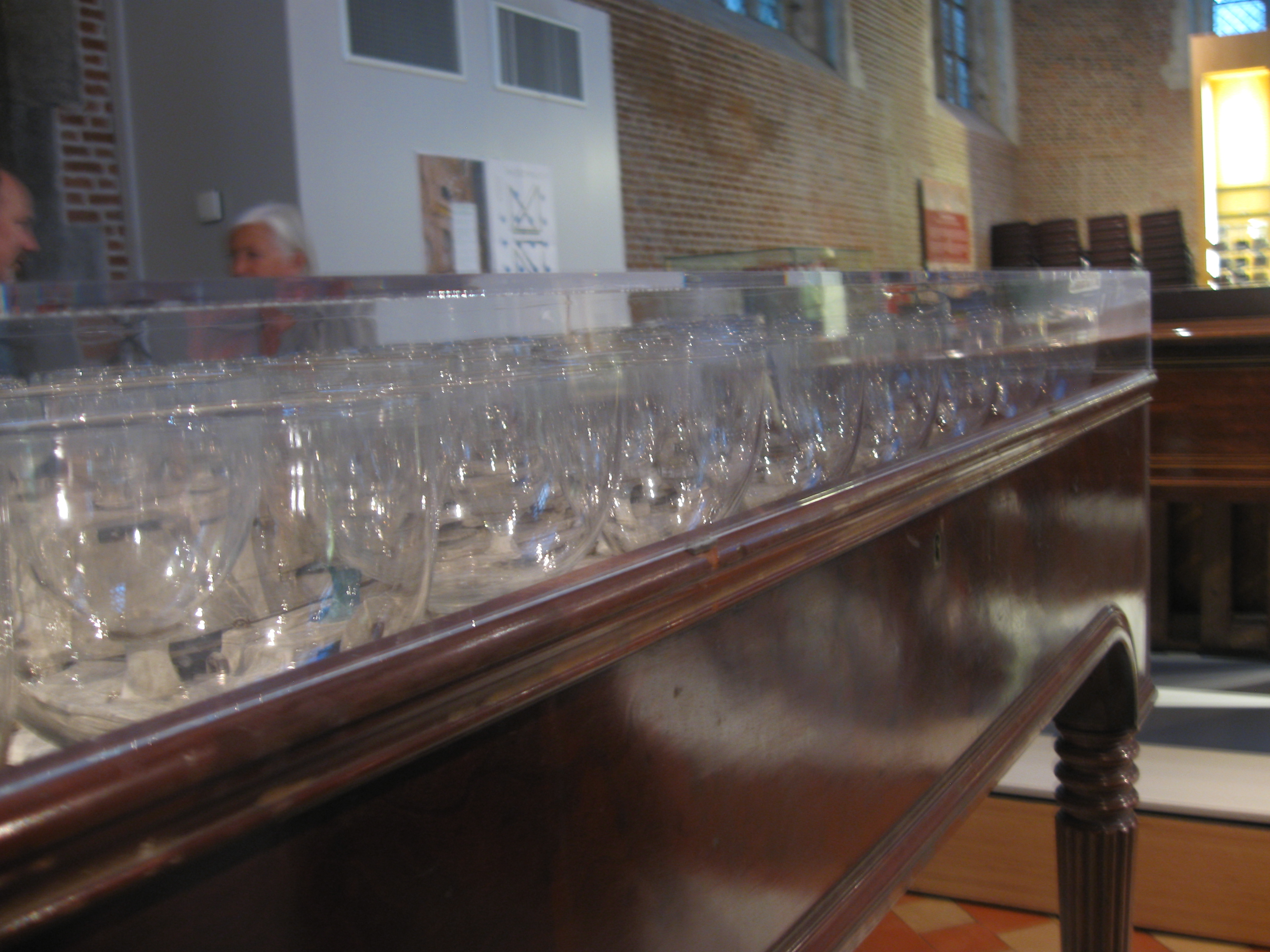
Glass Harp made by Joseph Mattau of Brussels, approximately 1850 - on display in the Vleeshuis Museum in Antwerp, Belgium

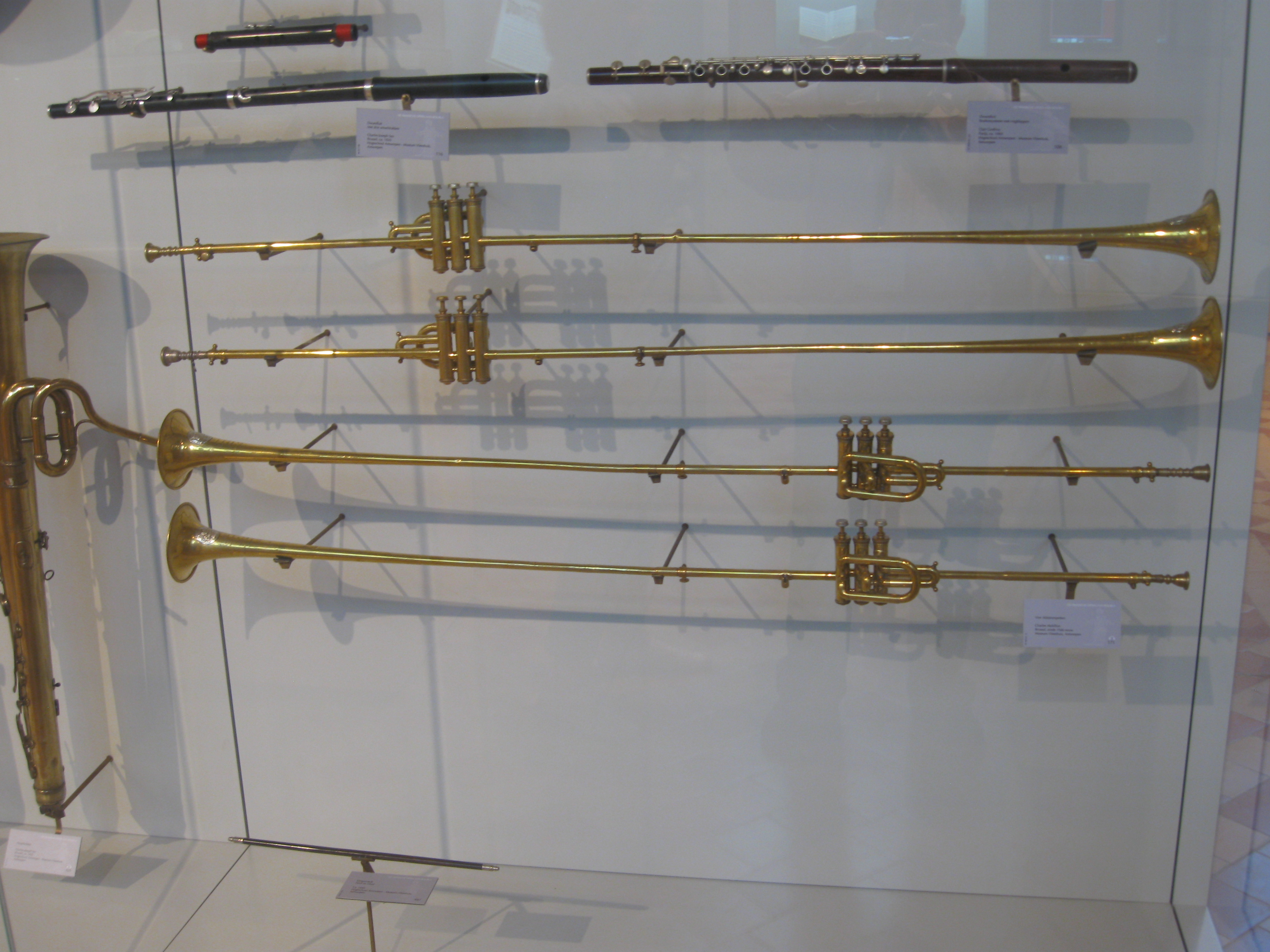
Four Aida trumpets (trumpets made especially for the triumphal scene in Giuseppe Verdi's Aida), manufactured by Charles Mahillon of Brussels, late 19th century

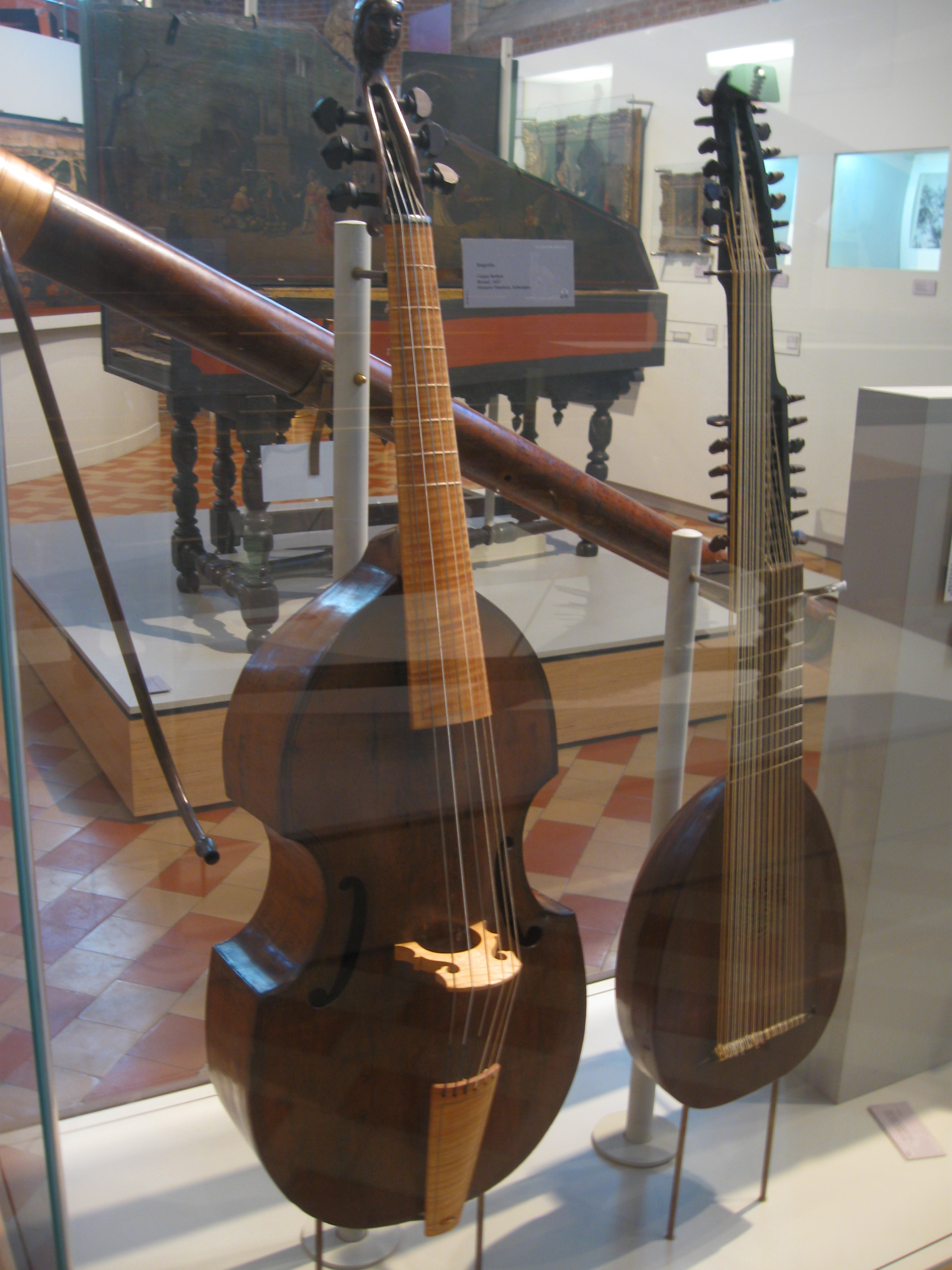
At left: bass gamba made by Gaspar Borbon of Brussels, 1697; at right: theorbo

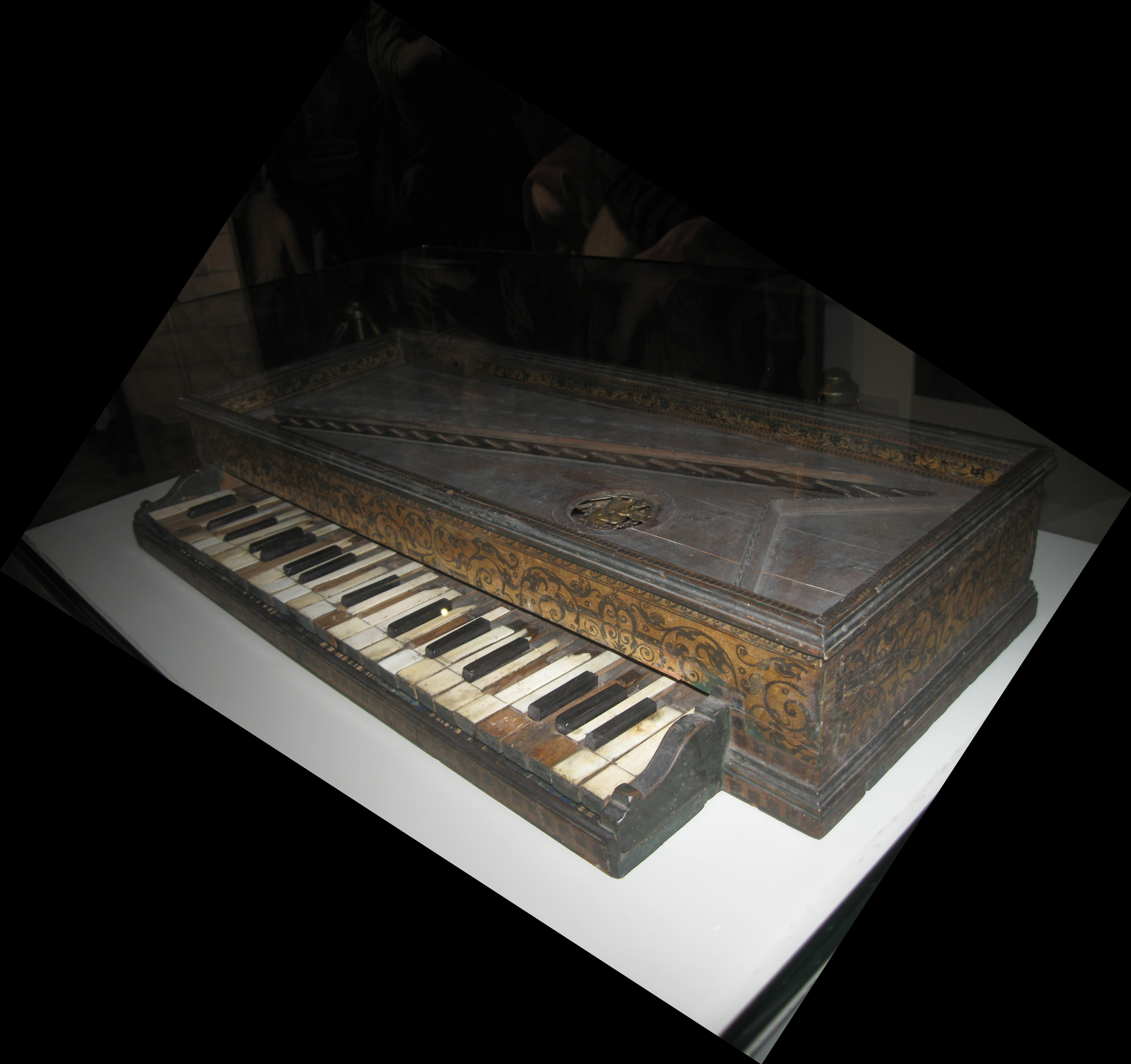
A virginal made by Andreas Ruckers of Antwerp, early 17th century
