= Zwijndrecht, Belgium =

Zwijndrecht
- Municipality
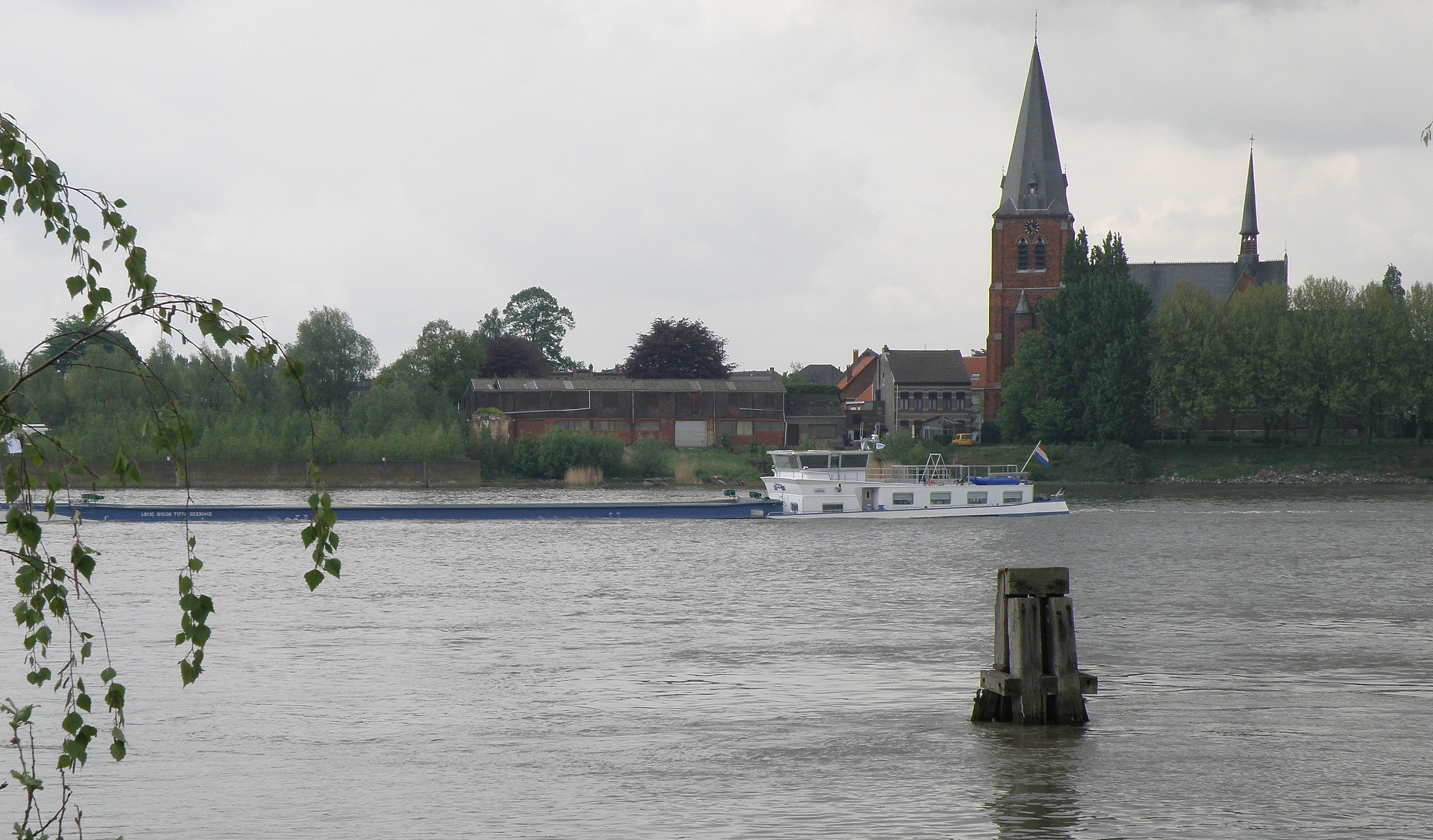

- Flag Coat of arms
- Interactive map of Zwijndrecht
- Location in Belgium
- Coordinates: 51°13′N 04°20′E
- Country: Belgium
- Community: Flemish Community
- Region: Flemish Region
- Province: East Flanders
- Arrondissement: Sint-Niklaas

Population (2018-01-01)
  - Total: 19,002
- Postal codes: 2070
- NIS code: 11056
- Area codes: 03
- Website: www.gemeentebkz.be

Zwijndrecht (Dutch pronunciation: [ˈzʋɛindrɛxt]) is a former municipality located in the Flemish province of East Flanders, in Belgium. On 1 January 2025, it fused with the municipalities of Beveren and Kruibeke to form the new municipality of Beveren-Kruibeke-Zwijndrecht, which resulted in it moving from the province of Antwerp to that of East Flanders. As well as Zwijndrecht proper, the former municipality includes the village of Burcht. In 2021, Zwijndrecht had a total population of 19,263.

== History ==
=== Origin of the name ===
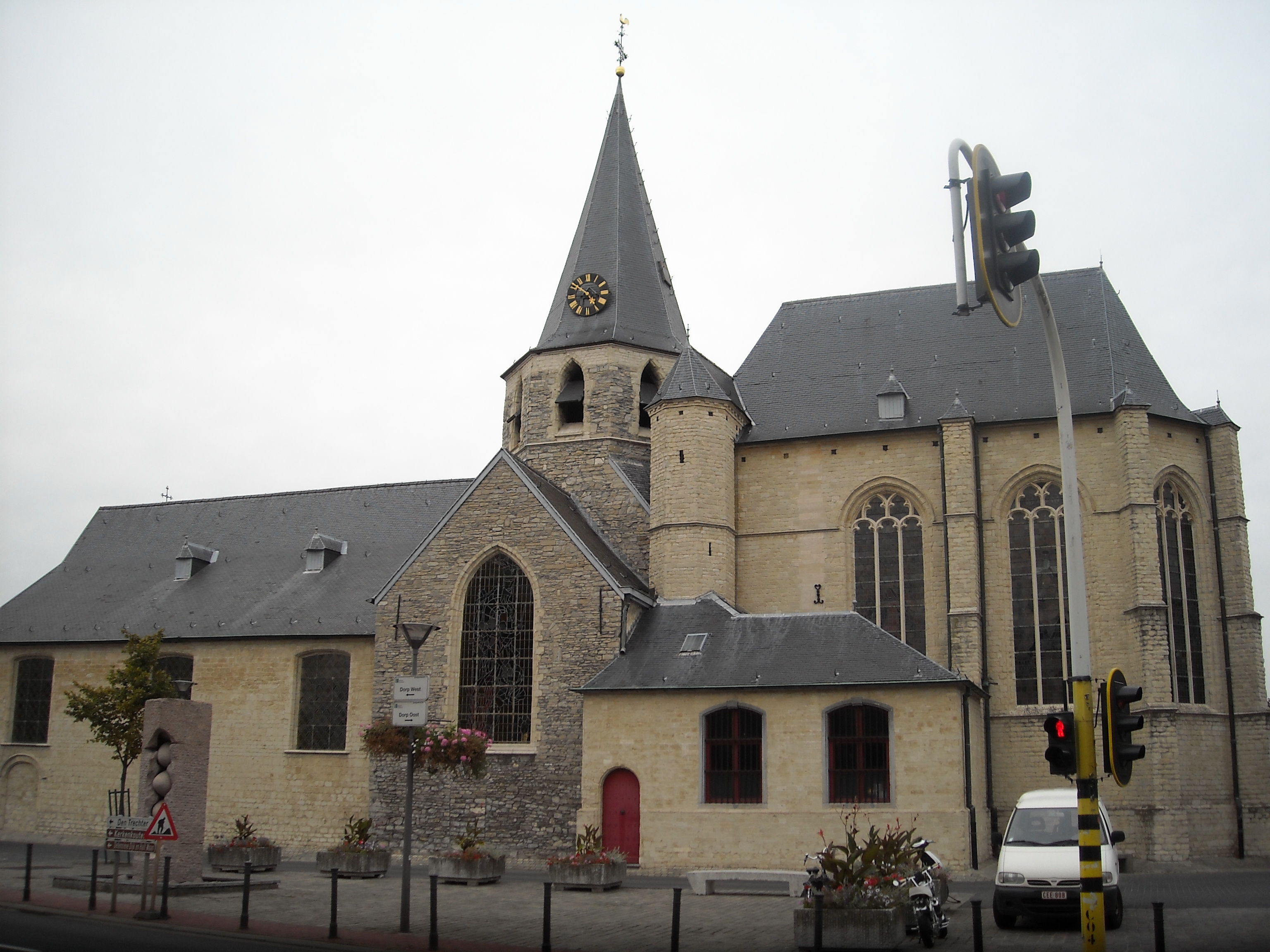
Heilig Kruiskerk, Zwijndrecht, Belgium. The earliest part of the church dates from the 12th Century.

The name Zwijndrecht is derived from the old Germanic words "swina drifti." The words "swina" and "drifti" are synonyms and both mean creek. "Drifti" evolved from dhreghi>drigti>dricht to drecht; the suffix –drecht appears frequently in place-names north of the river Scheldt, where streams and creeks are abundant.

=== Early history ===
While very little archaeological excavation has been done in the municipality of Zwijndrecht itself, numerous findings have been documented in the surrounding region, which is referred to as the Waasland. These have indicated occupation in the area from as early as the end of the Neolithic Period (c. 2200-1800 B.C.). Numerous indications of Roman occupation have also been uncovered in the Waasland area.

In the early Middle Ages, Zwijndrecht-Burcht was sparsely populated, its landscape consisting mainly of wet woodland and small settlements separated by forests. This situation remained until the latter half of the 11th century, when an increase in population necessitated changes in land use: the forests between settlements were cleared and fields were formed into communal agricultural spaces, using a three-course crop rotation system. These were referred to as "kouters" or ploughshares. Raised paths through the wetlands evolved into dikes, and by the 14th century, polders were in use.

=== Feudal Period ===
On 15 April 1281 the Count of Flanders, Gwijde van Dampierre, granted manorial rights to Nikolaas van Kets, making him Lord of Zwijndrecht. The seat of the Lords of Zwijndrecht was a manor house called the Kraaienhof (the ruins of which were demolished in the mid-20th century), which was located in what is now the village of Burcht. The van Kets held the manorial rights until 1445, when Wouter van Kets sold them to Jan Vilain. They passed by inheritance to the van Montmorency family. Due to financial pressures, the heir Filips II de Montmorency, Count of Horne (1524-1568) was forced to sell the title, property and rights to a conglomeration of four cities, Brugge, Gent, Ieper and the Brugse Vrije, known as the "Vier Leden" (four members). After rebelling against Spanish rule during the Eighty Years War, the Vier Leden were forced to forfeit the property to the Spanish crown in 1585, but it was later returned to them. The dikes and infrastructure were so badly damaged and neglected during the Eighty Years War, that the Vier Leden were forced to loan money for repairs and restoration from Jan van Hove. When the Vier Leden defaulted on the loan, the property, rights and title defaulted to Jan van Hove, making him the new Lord of Zwijndrecht-Burcht. Van Hove held the property until 1621, when the Staten van Vlaanderen (formerly the Vier Leden) was able to pay its debts and reacquire it. After regaining the property, the Staten van Vlaanderen promptly auctioned it off to the highest bidder, an Italian businessman named Jacomo Antonio Carenna, who then became Lord of Zwijndrecht and Burcht. In 1666, he divided the property between his two sons, Jan Francisco Carenna (Zwijndrecht) and Ignacius Carenna (Burcht). Burcht and Zwijndrecht became separate villages and remained so until they were reunited as the municipality of Zwijndrecht in 1977.

For the further history specifically of Burcht, see the article on Burcht.

Paulo Carenna, Lord of Zwijndrecht and grandson of Jacomo Carenna, auctioned off the property and title on Antwerp's historical Vrijdagmarkt in 1699. It was purchased by Jacques de Lannoy. It passed by inheritance through his daughter Anne Marie de Lannoy to his son-in-law, Daniel Gerardo Melijn in 1732. Daniel Malijn's heir was also a daughter, Anna Marie Isabella Melijn, and therefore her husband Louis Balthasar de Heuvel became Lord of Zwijndrecht. Louis Balthasar de Heuvel's son, Louis Charles Joseph de Heuvel, fought for his mother's inheritance in court as his father did not want to give it up to him. However, before the case could be resolved, the French Revolution and the resultant dissolution of feudal rights and titles made their legal conflict moot. At this point Louis Charles Joseph, who had become broken and paranoid of his father's wrath, became a vagabond. He died in a French prison in 1800.

=== Industrialization: the Nineteenth and Twentieth Centuries ===
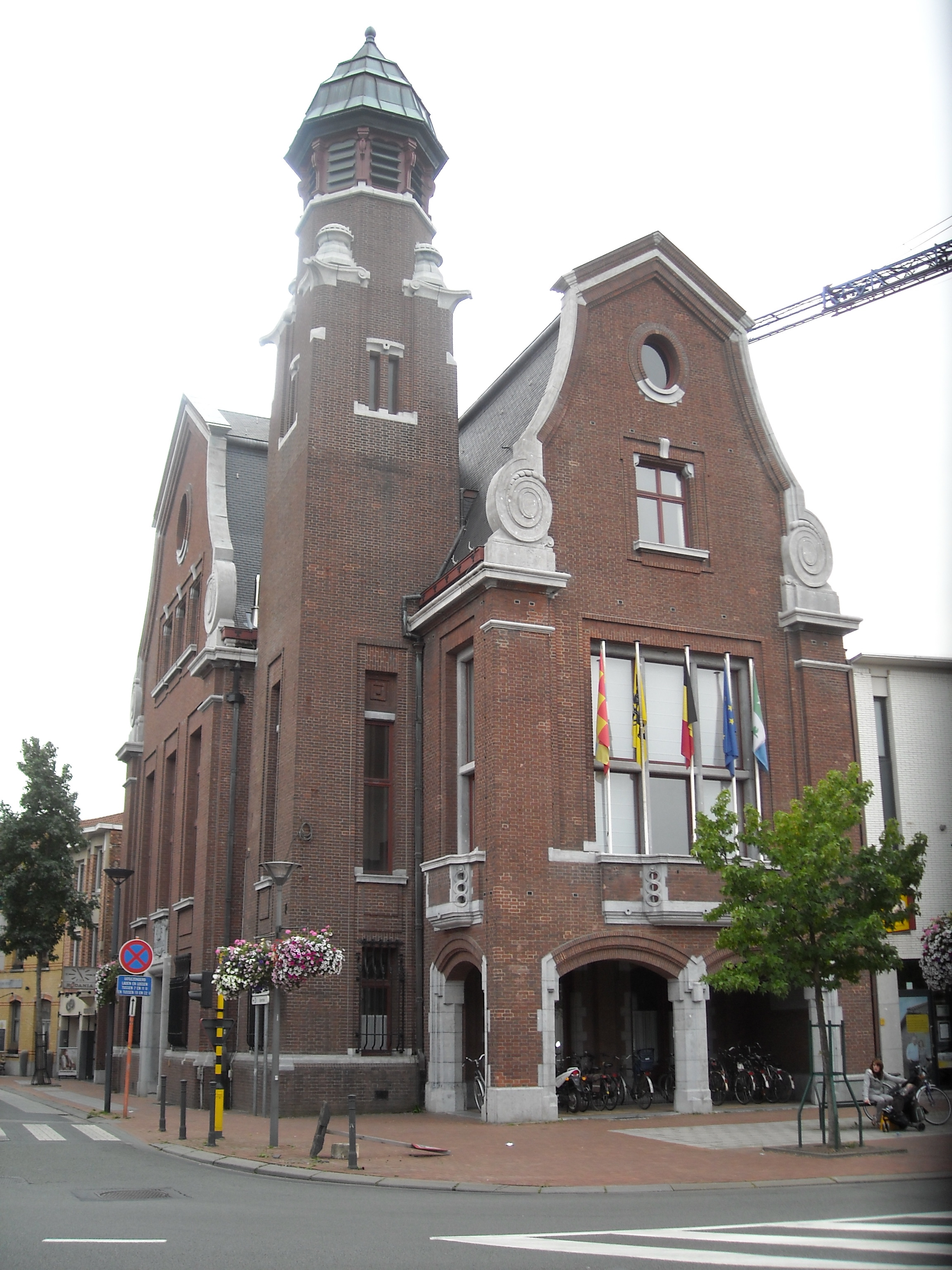
Old Town Hall, Zwijndrecht, Belgium. Built between 1931 and 1935, designed by architect Ernest Nagels

Geographically and historically, Zwijndrecht and Burcht were originally part of the province of East Flanders, which fell under the jurisdiction of the Count of Flanders. However, in 1923, the two villages were transferred to the Province of Antwerp. The villages were primarily agrarian, but by the middle of the nineteenth century, Burcht had become the site of heavy industry. The fertile land in Borgerweert (part of Burcht) was filled in with dredged slurry from the river Scheldt to accommodate the building of factories. Among the industries established there at the time were a guano factory, a linoleum factory, a cement factory, a pots and pans factory, and a lard processing plant. It is currently the seat of the Ytong plant, which manufactures building blocks. The Lt. Thoumsin military base, which houses the 11th Battalion of Engineers of the Belgian army, is also located in Burcht.

In the nineteenth century, Zwijndrecht became a bedroom community for Antwerp, while mostly maintaining its agrarian character. It became heavily industrialized in the twentieth century, becoming the location for numerous industries, most of which are clustered around harbors on the Scheldt.

=== World Wars ===
During World War I, Zwijndrecht and Burcht and its two forts were part of the Belgian defensive line. By 1914, the two villages were full of Belgian soldiers, and orders were issued to reinforce the Fort of Zwijndrecht and the Fort of Kruibeke. Local civilian residents were recruited for the reinforcement work, soldiers were quartered in private homes and factories, farmers were required to loan their horses and carts for military use, and food and goods were confiscated for the military. In spite of all efforts, Belgium fell to the Germans in October 1914 and Burcht and Zwijndrecht, like all the German-occupied communities in Belgium, suffered greatly for the next four years from food shortages. By the end of the war, 80 young people from Zwijndrecht and Burcht had perished on the front. 82 civilian unemployed civilians from Burcht as well as 99 non-unemployed citizens had been deported to Germany as forced labor. In addition, 5 civilians were deported to Germany for political reasons. A total of 8 citizens from Burcht died as a result of these deportations. Zwijndrecht counted 155 forced laborers and civilian prisoners deported to Germany, of which 5 did not survive. Three of these, Jan Baptist Wathy and Jozef and Frans Van Gaever died when the ship transporting them was torpedoed.

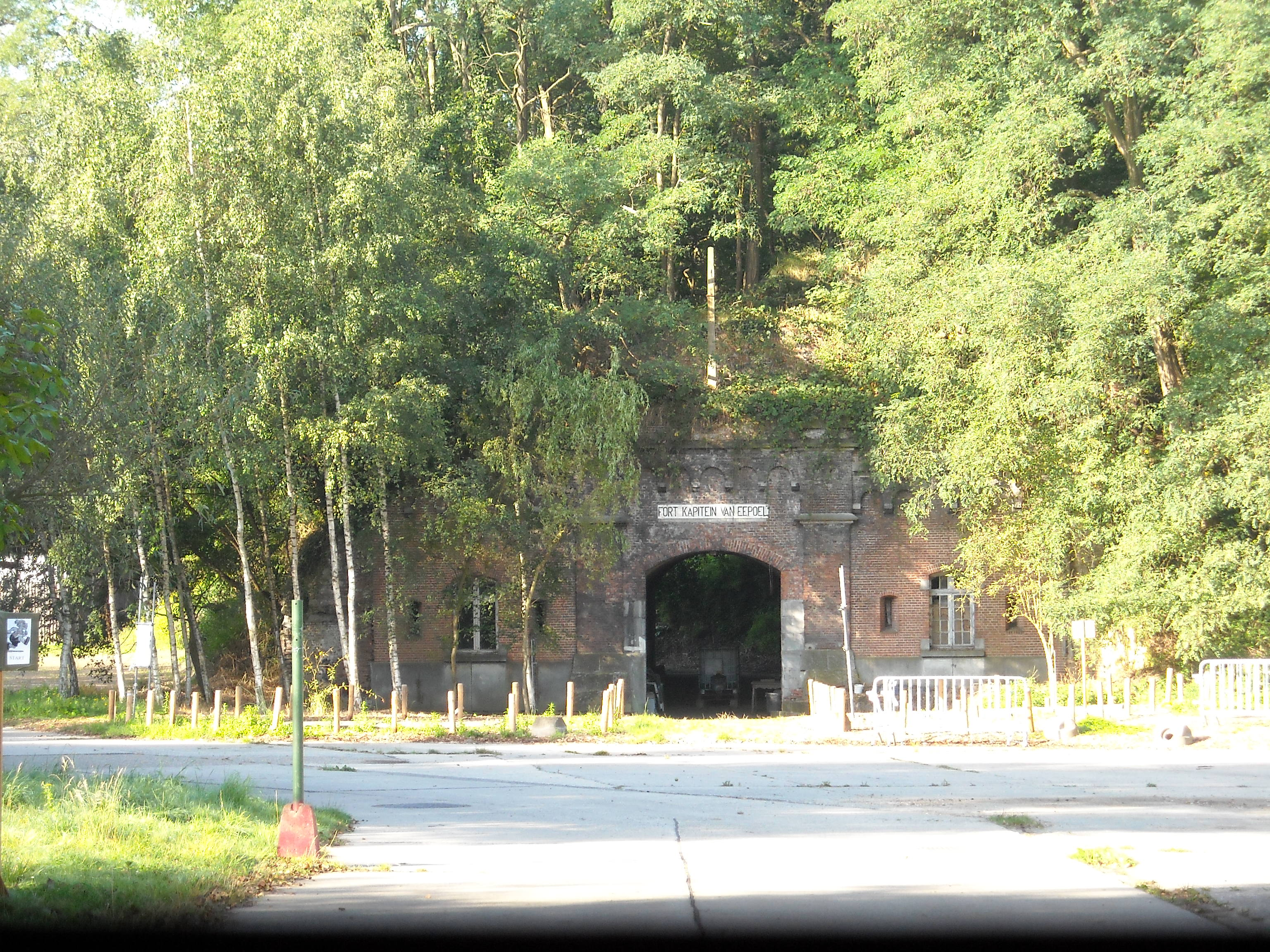
Fort of Kruibeke in Burcht, built in 1870 as part of the national redoubt of Belgium.

By 1939, Zwindrecht and Burcht were once again preparing for war with Germany. On 18 May 1940 the Swastika flag had already been raised on the Antwerp Cathedral. Although retreating Belgian troops attempted to blow up the two tunnels leading to the left bank of the Scheldt to prevent the Germans from crossing easily, the explosives in the pedestrian tunnel failed to detonate completely, allowing the German troops to cross the river. During the resulting battle on the streets of Zwijndrecht, 16 German and 29 Belgian soldiers died, in addition to 32 civilians.

After years of Nazi occupation, the British army liberated Antwerp in September 1944. In an attempt to prevent the Allies from being able to use the Port of Antwerp, the Germans bombarded the harbor with V-1 and V-2 rockets. However, most of the rockets missed their intended target (the port) and fell instead in the surrounding areas, including Burcht and Zwijndrecht. A total of 76 V-bombs fell on Zwijndrecht-Burcht between 25 October 1944 and 28 March 1945. In Zwindrecht, a total of 19 civilians were killed and 48 were wounded by the V-rockets and 85 houses were rendered uninhabitable. In Burcht, 14 citizens were killed. 50 houses were destroyed completely, and more than 250 houses were badly damaged.

=== Contemporary ===
The 3M factory located in Zwijndrecht has caused toxic levels of PFOS pollution that is expected to impact agriculture in a 15 kilometers radius. Large amounts of PFOS were discovered in 2018 in the ground near the 3M site, where it had produced this substance until 2002, when the construction of Oosterweel Link, a massive construction project to complete the R1 Antwerp Ring Road, began.

== Notable residents ==
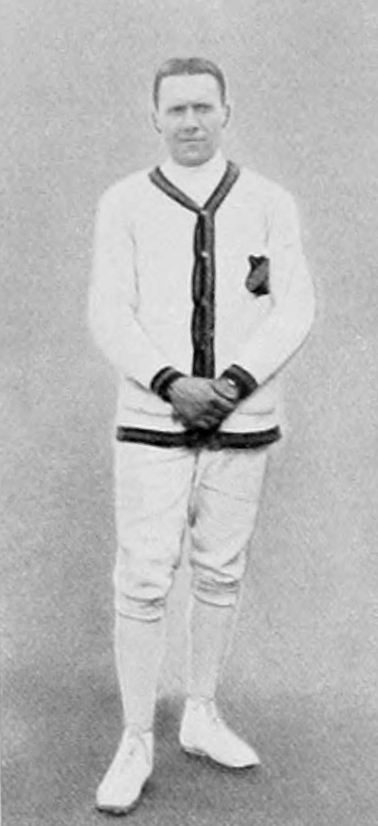
Olympic champion Paul Anspach

- Paul Anspach (1882–1991), épée and foil fencer, two-time Olympic champion
- Gia Baldi (stage name of Maria Lea Joos), b. 1936 in Burcht. Opera singer.
- Fred Bervoets, b. 1942 in Burcht. Painter and graphic artist.
- Pastor Michiel Cop, 1755–1799. Pastor of the church in Zwijndrecht, he resisted the French occupation under the Sanculottes, and died while escaping a prison camp in French Guiana.
- Emiel Van Hemeldonck, 1897–1881. Author.
- Kobe Ilsen b. 1981. T.V. reporter and announcer.
- Gino De Keersmaeker, b. 1970 in Zwijndrecht. Paralympic athlete.
- Alfred Ost, (1884 Zwijndrecht-1945). Painter and graphic artist.
- Jean Baptist Tassijns, 1751–1799. Boerenkrijger (resistance fighter) against the French occupation under the Sansculottes, he was executed in Haasdonck in 1799.
- Leo Tindemans, b. 1922 in Zwijndrecht. Politician, former Prime Minister of Belgium.

== Twin towns — sister cities ==
Zwijndrecht (BE) is twinned with:

- Idstein, Germany
- Zwijndrecht, Netherlands
