= Beveren-Kruibeke-Zwijndrecht =

Municipality in East Flanders, Belgium

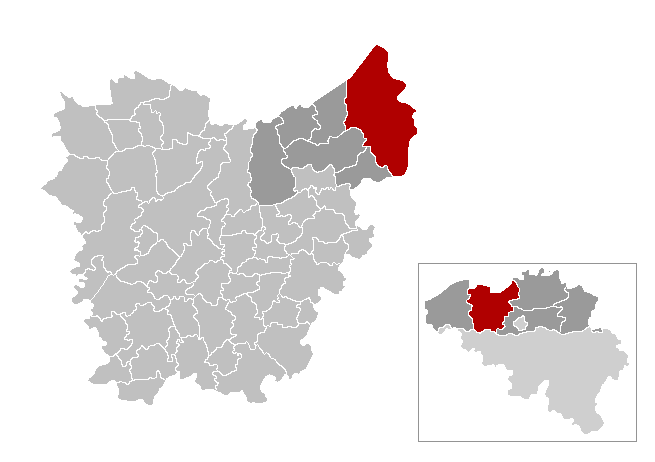
Location

Beveren-Kruibeke-Zwijndrecht is a municipality located in the Belgian province of East Flanders, and belongs to the Waasland (Dutch: Land van Waas).

Beveren-Kruibeke-Zwijndrecht is the result of the merger of Beveren, Kruibeke, and Zwijndrecht on January 1, 2025.

Zwijndrecht belonged to Antwerp Province.
