= Christopher Cock (auctioneer) =

English auctioneer and picture restorer

Christopher Cock (died 1748) was an English auctioneer and picture restorer who lived and worked in London. His earliest known auction was in 1717. He operated from various premises in Soho until 1731, when he moved to the Great Piazza, Covent Garden. Cock was auctioneer of the properties and possessions of many well-known men of the time. He was married to Ann, but nothing more is known of his wife or any children; Cock died in 1748 and is buried at St Paul's, Covent Garden.

== Biography ==
Christopher Cock was probably born in London in the 1690s, but this is not certain. It has been suggested that his father was John Cock (d. 1714), printseller and picture dealer in London; no firm evidence has been found to substantiate this, although a Christopher Edward Cock, son of John and Mary was baptised at St Andrew Holborn, London on 30 September 1695.

Cock died in December 1748, and was buried at St Paul's, Covent Garden on the 16th. The church registers record where he was interred, but his memorial no longer exists.

=== Auctioneer ===
George Vertue made the first mention of Cock as an auctioneer, noting his appearance in 1717. Cock's first newspaper advertisement was placed in 1722 for the sale by auction of “A Most Excellent Collection of Pictures by the Celebrated Italian and other Masters”; thus began a successful career lasting some 30 years. More of his newspaper advertisements, spanning over 20 years, are available online.

Some 30 auction catalogues are also available, demonstrating the range of Cock's clientele, which included John Bridges of Lincoln's Inn; Sir Robert Cotton, Postmaster General; Spencer Compton, 1st Earl of Wilmington; Sir James Thornhill, late principal history painter to His Majesty; Edward, Earl of Oxford; Sir William Billers, Lord Mayor of London; Josiah Burchett, Esquire, late Secretary to the Admiralty and James, Duke of Chandos (twice). Well-known figures of the period would attend Cock's auctions, e.g. Joshua Reynolds and Alexander Pope at the Earl of Oxford sale on 9 March 1742.

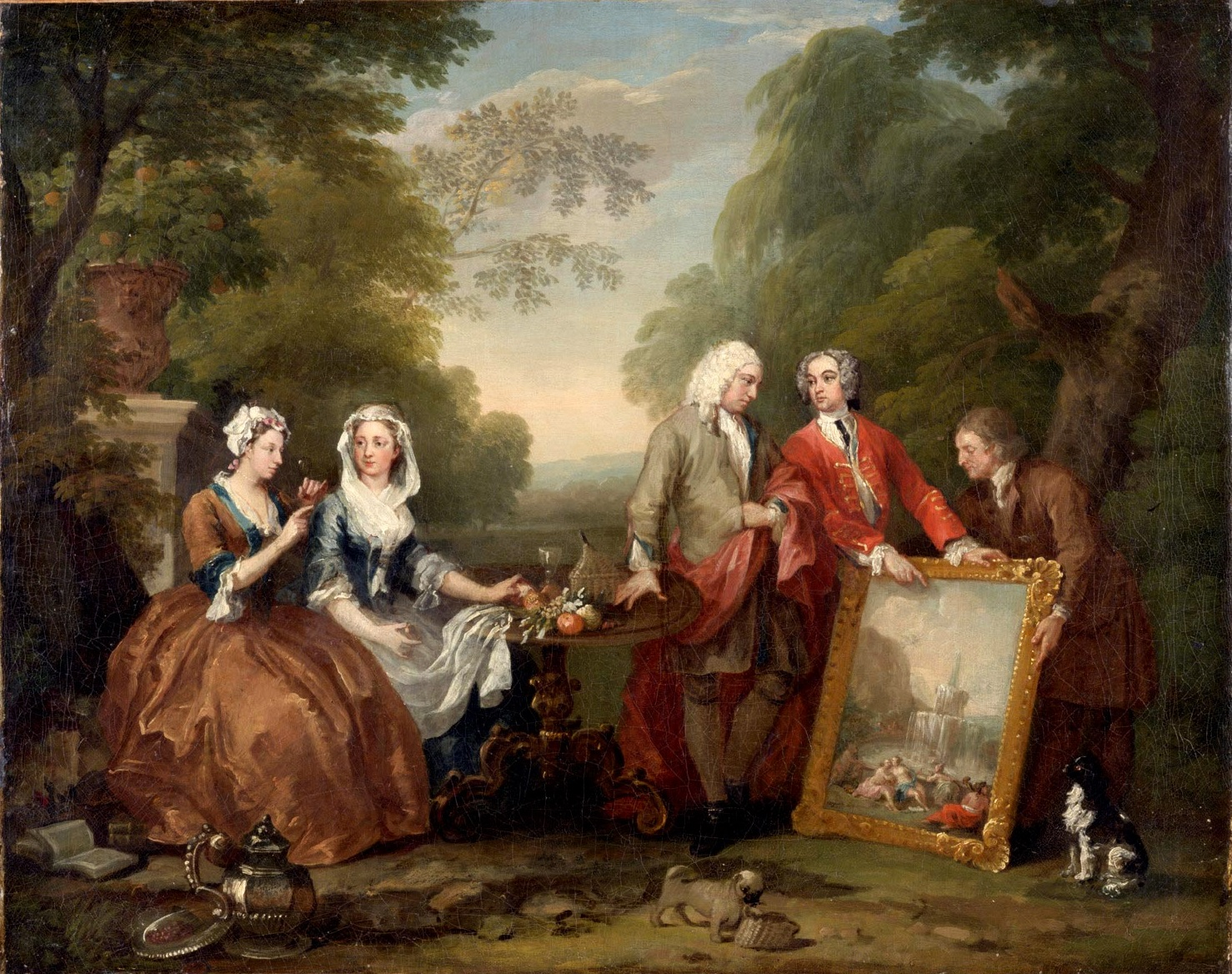
Christopher Cock is at the right, holding the painting

Records show that Cock charged a five per cent commission up to £40 or £50 and used a sliding scale thereafter. His auctioneering methods were innovative. For example, as early as 1737 he advertised on his picture catalogues that "any Gentlemen that want the Prices mark’d in the Catalogues, Mr Cock has given his Servant leave to do it". These estimates for paintings did not become a standard practice until 1973.

In about 1731 Cock ordered from Hogarth a “conversation” of six people (later reduced to five). Sir Andrew Fountaine is shown standing, draped in a red cloak, looking down at a painting held by a deferential Cock. The painting (in the Philadelphia Museum of Art), and a copy of it, are described in more detail in Eisenberg's catalogue raisonnée. This is the only known image of Christopher Cock.

Cock was satirised by Henry Fielding in his 1737 play The Historical Register in which Christopher Cock appears as Christopher Hen, played by Charlotte Clarke.

In 1747 Cock formed a partnership with Abraham Langford, who took over the business on Cock's death a year later.

=== Family and Residences ===
In his will, Cock refers to his dear and loving wife Ann, but no record of their marriage has been found, nor of any children.

For the first part of his career, Christopher Cock lived in various locations in Broad Street (now Broadwick Street):

- 1722 – Next the Vine Tavern, Broad Street, St James's
- 1722–1724 – Upper end of Broad Street, next Golden Square
- 1725 – The Two Blue Spires, Broad Street
- 1726–1731 – Poland St, corner of Broad Street

In 1731 he moved to No. 9–10, the Great Piazza, Covent Garden, where he remained until his death. The previous occupant for 10 years had been the Hon. Edward Wortley Montagu.

Behind the house Cock erected an auction room, which remained in use for over a hundred years: next by Abraham Langford and then, in 1790, by Henry Robins. As well as auctions, Cock used his rooms to exhibit and sell paintings by leading artists, such as Sir Godfrey Kneller, Sir James Thornhill and Peter Tillemans. Christopher Cock's will also showed that part of his premises was leased to Allan Ramsay, the Scottish portrait painter, at a yearly rental of £63. He also held three shares in a newspaper, the Daily Advertiser. After his death, Cock's collection, including pictures, was sold by Langford in May 1749 on his former premises in the Great Piazza.

Hogarth's 1745 etching The Battle of the Pictures was another satire involving Cock, whose auction house was nearby. It took the form of a bidder's ticket for an auction of paintings by Hogarth. Copies of old master paintings outside Cock's house are shown attacking paintings by Hogarth.
