= Isabella Brant (drawing) =

Drawing by Peter Paul Rubens

A portrait of Isabella Brant
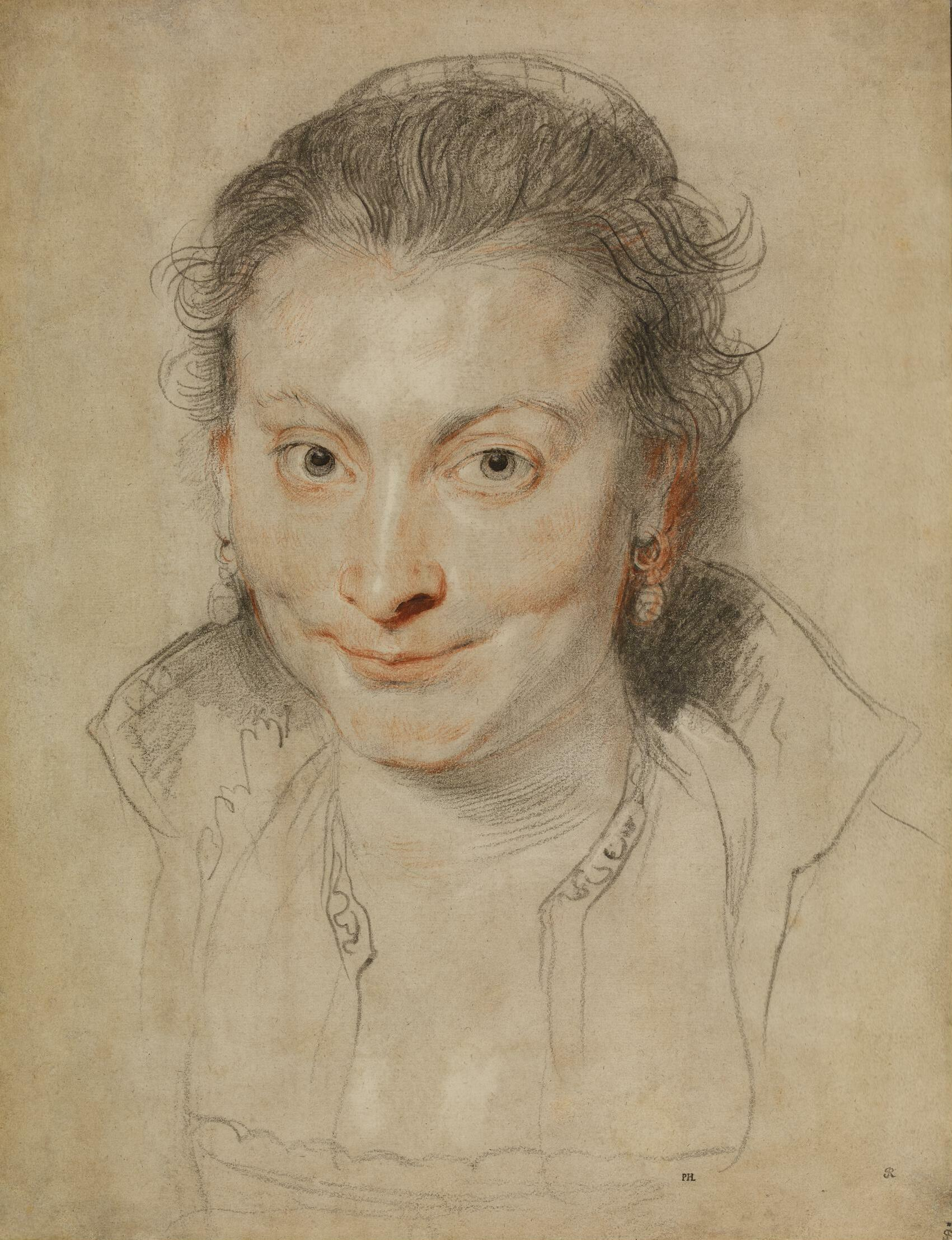
- Artist: Peter Paul Rubens
- Year: c. 1621
- Type: drawing (trois crayons)
- Dimensions: 38.1 cm × 29.4 cm (15.0 in × 11.6 in)
- Location: Department of Prints and Drawings, British Museum, London

Isabella Brant, a portrait drawing, was executed in Antwerp around 1621, by Flemish artist and diplomat, Peter Paul Rubens (1577–1640). Brant (1591–1626) was Rubens' first wife and modelled for some of his portraits until her untimely death in 1626. The portrait is drawn in black and red chalk with white heightening on brown wash paper.

This drawing is noted for its 'immediacy and attractiveness, and was the basis for three oil paintings. The first was painted in 1621 by Rubens' pupil, Anthony van Dyck as a gift to his mentor. This portrait now hangs in the National Gallery of Art in Washington. The second, painted by Rubens between 1620 and 1625, is located in the Cleveland Museum of Art and the third also painted by Rubens in 1625, is located in the Uffizi Gallery in Florence.

Following Ruben's death, the drawing passed through five known collectors and was eventually acquired by the British Museum in 1893.

During re-mounting work in 1964, a rough sketch was discovered on the reverse side of the portrait. The sketch, also in red and black chalk is presumed to be a self-portrait of Rubens and his second wife Hélène Fourment (1614–1673) with Rubens' child.

== History ==
The portrait of Isabella Brant was drawn by Rubens around 1621, when she was about 30 years old and had been married to Rubens for 12 years. Rubens employed the aux trois crayons technique, using red and black chalk, with white heightening on light grey-brown paper. The head of the portrait was sketched in detail while the eyes had been retouched with pen and black ink. This drawing, which is the only one sketched of Isabella Brant in this medium, has been admired for centuries as a fine example of Rubens' portrait drawing.

Rubens' intimate drawing was intended to capture the sweetness and vivacity of his first wife. The sitter's head is shown with a slight downward tilt — facing slightly to the left and looking directly at the observer. She is shown wearing drop earrings. Her hair and features are depicted with care, while her clothes are sketchily portrayed. Her mischievous smile is further enhanced by the dimples in her plump cheeks, which complement her alert gaze.

The great detail and animation of the portrait suggests that Rubens had great affection for his wife. The drawing was used as a basis for three oil portraits. The 1621 painting of Brant outside the portico of the family home, was done by Rubens' pupil, Anthony van Dyck as a parting gift to his mentor. The striking similarity between the portrait and drawing meant that van Dyck would have had access to the sketch for this work. The Cleveland portrait by Rubens, painted between 1620 and 1625, displays similarities such as the pulled-back hair and the mocking smile (although it is somewhat forced in the painting), however the sitter is tilted more to the left. The Uffizi, portrait (also by Rubens) was produced close to Brant's death in June 1626. Although the pose is similar, the face exhibits puffiness as a result of her illness.

Portrait of Isabella Brant by Anthony van Dyck, c. 1623–1626, National Gallery of Art, Washington DC

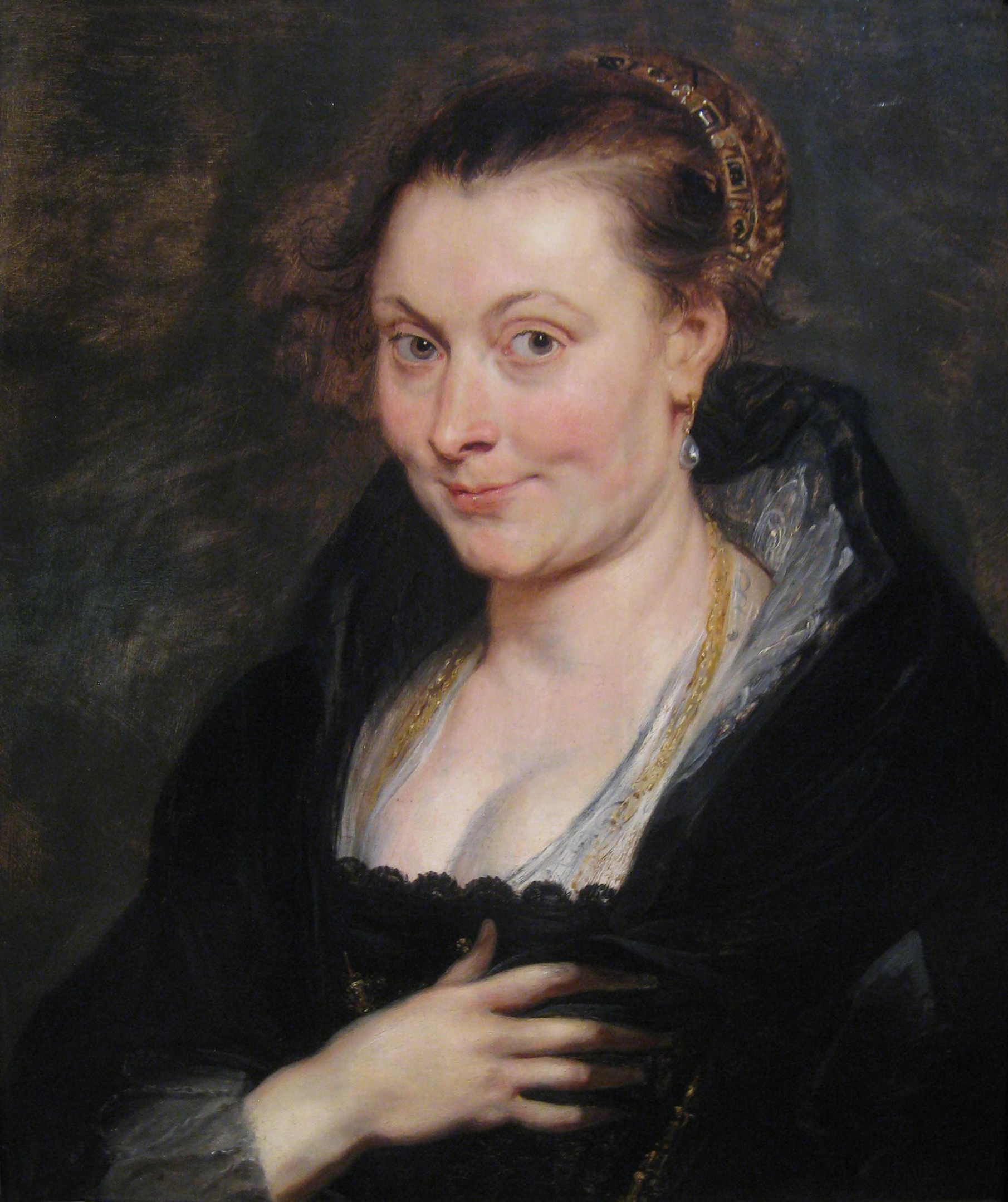
Portrait of Isabella Brant, c. 1620–1625, Cleveland Museum of Art

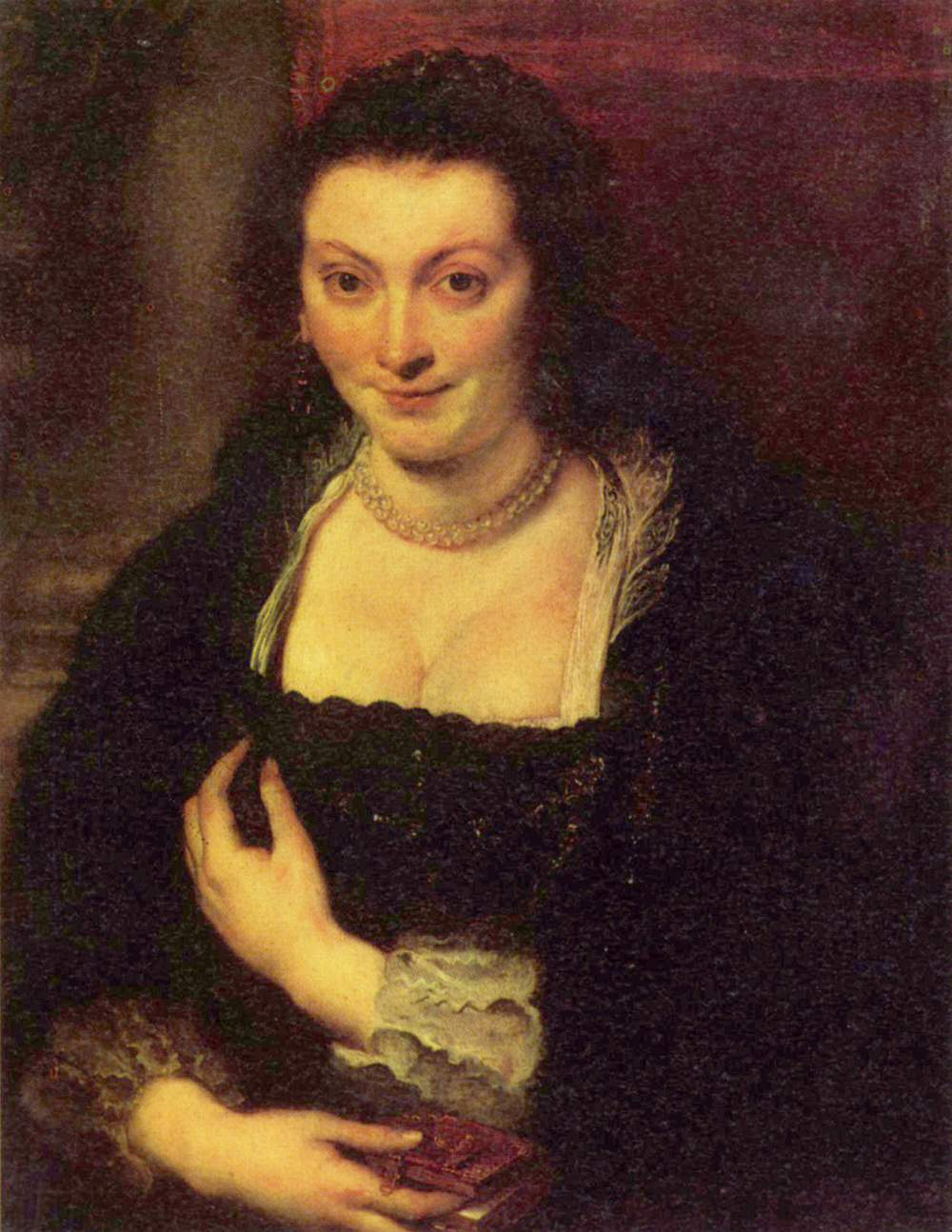
Rubens oil portrait of Isabella Brant, c. 1625, Uffizi, Florence,

=== Discovery of sketch ===
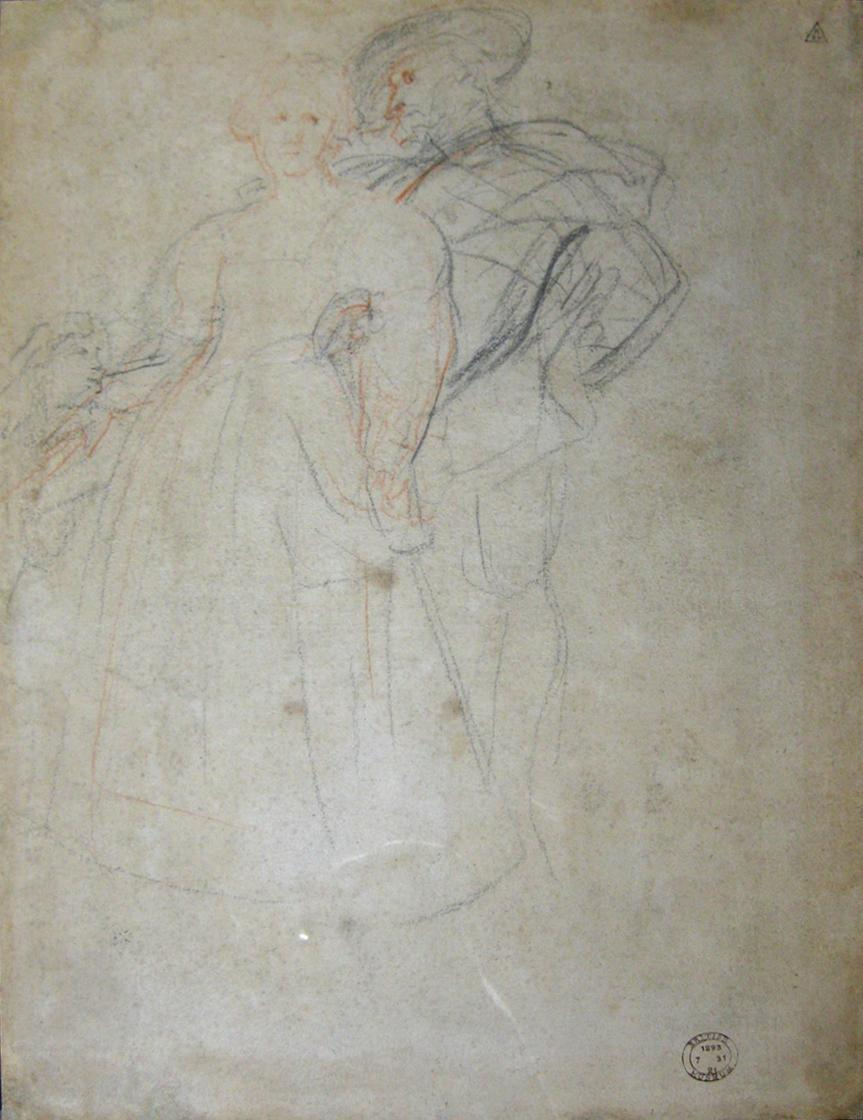
Sketch of Peter Paul Rubens with Hélène Fourment and child found on the reverse side of the drawing of Isabella Brant.

In 1964, the drawing was re-mounted in preparation for its inaugural showing at the 1965 "Masterpieces of the Print Room" exhibition at the British Museum. The removal of the mount revealed a rough sketch in red and black chalk of a bearded man with hat standing beside a woman and a small child. This sketch is upside-down relative to the front side.

The discovery was first published by Michael Jaffé in The Burlington Magazine in 1965. He dated the sketch around the 1630s according to the impressionist technique. He went on further to identify the people in the sketch as Rubens with his second wife Hélène Fourment and their child. He surmised that the sketch would not necessarily have been used as a basis for portraits containing similar family groupings such as Rubens and Hélène Fourment in their Garden at Munich, or Rubens and Hélène Fourment and their son Peter Paul in the Metropolitan Museum of Art, New York. Opinions also varied on the date of the sketch and the age and sex of the child. Anne-Marie Logan based her analysis on the New York painting and suggested the child to be either their first born, Clara Johanna (b.1632) or Peter Paul (b.1637) thus dating the sketch to about 1638. The opinion was not shared by Hans Vlieghe who compared the similarity of Fourment's pose with that of the portrait of Rubens, Hélène Fourment and Nicolaas Rubens (The Walk in the Garden). Vlieghe supported Daughtery's stance that the child would have been Nicolaas Rubens from the evidence of the garden portrait.

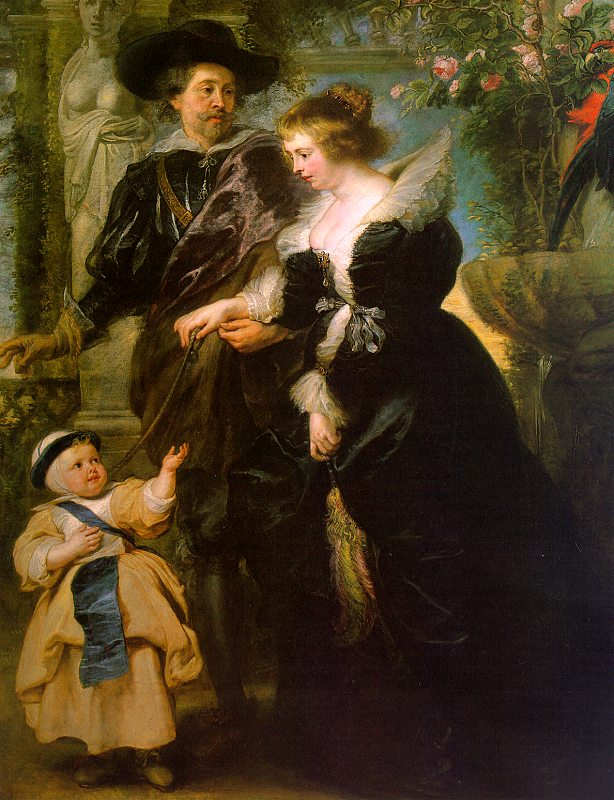
Rubens and Hélène Fourment and their son Peter Paul c. 1639, Metropolitan Museum of Art, New York

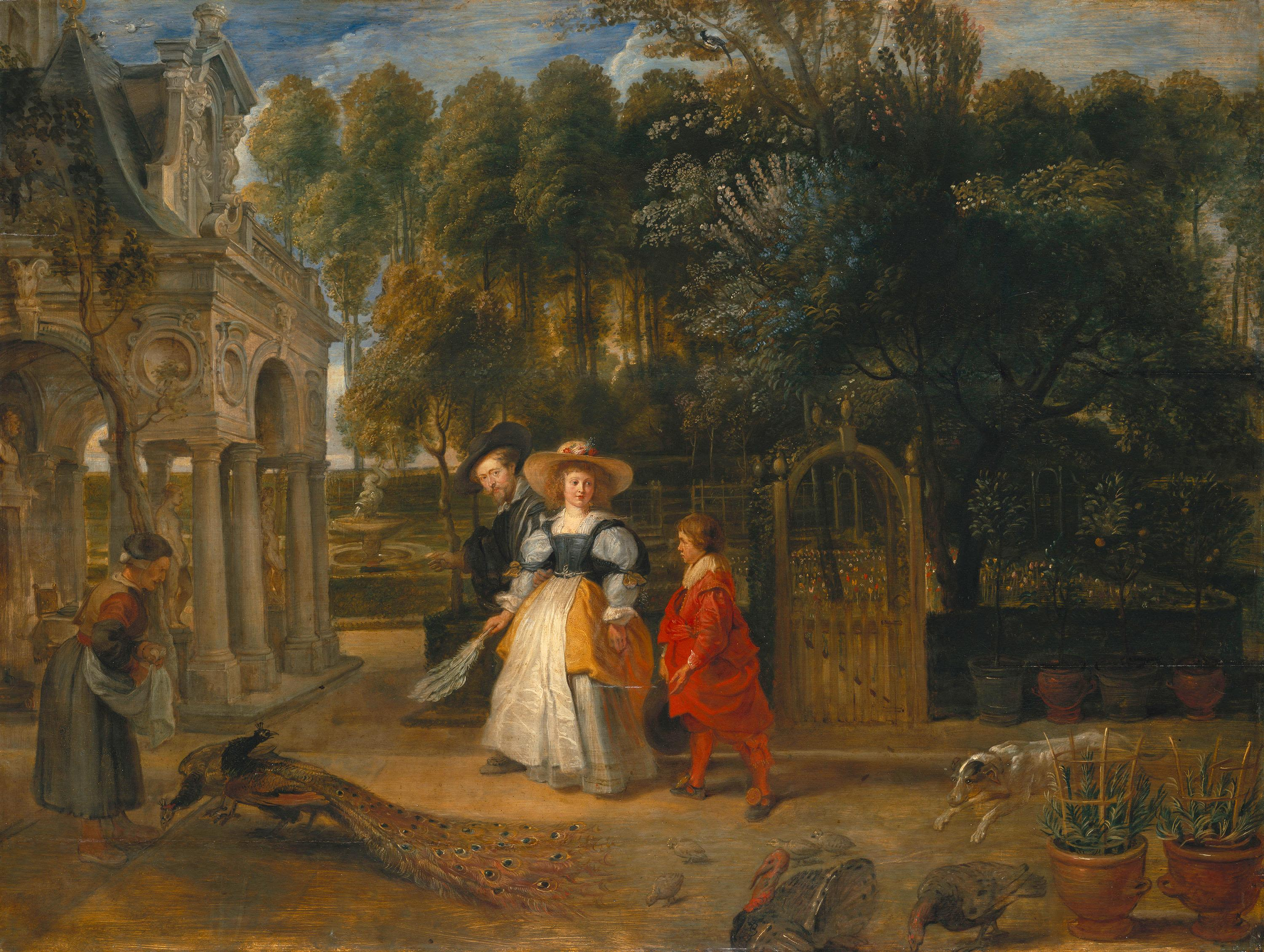
The Walk in the Garden, depicting Peter Paul Rubens, his second wife Hélène Fourment and Nicolaas Rubens c. 1640, Alte Pinakothek, München

Based on these findings, it was presumed that Rubens kept the Brant drawing and other drawings of his family in his studio to refer to when painting portraits of the members of his family. These personal paintings would have stayed in the possession of the family and been proudly displayed at home.

== Provenance ==
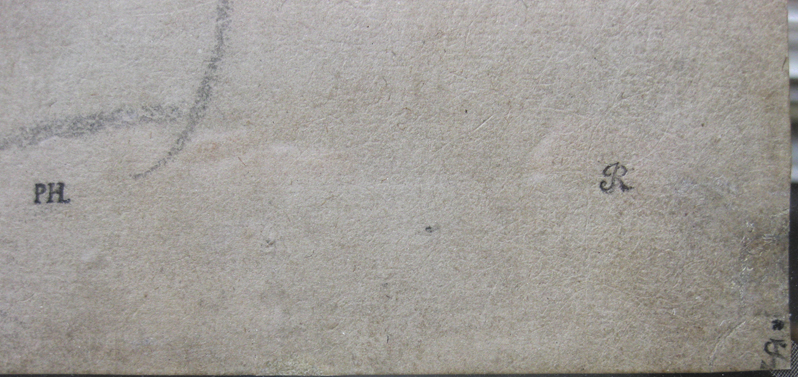
Collector marks on the recto side. Detail, bottom right corner, L-R Prosper Henry Lankrink, Jonathan Richardson Senior and George John Spencer, 2nd Earl Spencer

This drawing was in the possession of various collectors, of which five are known, prior to its acquisition by the British Museum. Their identities are revealed by the collector marks found on the recto (front) and verso (back) side of the portrait. The collector marks are identified by Lugt numbers, a cataloguing system created by Fritz Lugt (1884–1970).

There are three marks on the recto side located on the bottom right of the portrait. They have been linked to three collectors Prosper Henry Lankrink, Jonathan Richardson Senior and George John Spencer, 2nd Earl Spencer.

The verso side has one mark on the top and bottom right corners. The top mark is linked to Robert Stayner Holford and the bottom is the British Museum acquisition stamp.

=== Prosper Henry Lankrink ===
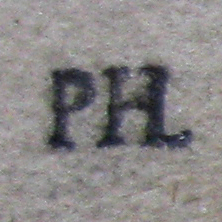
Collector mark for Prosper Henry Lankrink (L.2090)

The collector mark for Prosper Henry Lankrink (1628–1692) is identified by "PHL" (Lugt. 2090) with the H and L conjoined.

Lankrink was a painter who trained in the Netherlands before moving to England. He was employed as an assistant by Peter Lely (Pieter Van der Faes) (1618–1680), the leading portraitist to the court of Charles II. Lankrink was influenced by Lely's superb collection of drawings, paintings and prints. After Lely's death in 1680, Lankrink had the opportunity to purchase part of his art collection, including the Flemish drawings by Rubens and van Dyck, in a sale of assets in 1682 and 1688. Lankrink was popular at court and in high society. His increasingly debauched lifestyle was the cause of his growing debt. When Lankrink died in 1692, his assets were sold to pay off his creditors. The sale of Lankrink's assets was announced in 1693:

The sale of Lanckrinck's most curious and vast collection of drawings and Prints will begin on the 8th day of May, at 3 after Noon, at the House of the Deceased, at the Golden Triangle in the Piazza's in Covent Garden

— London Gazette

Amongst the items catalogued, one of the three items (Nos. 220 and 223) described as "An Head, by Rubens" and (No. 316) "A Woman's Head, by Rubens", could have been the drawing of Isabella Brant.

=== Sir James Thornhill ===
There is no collector mark for Sir James Thornhill (1675 or 1676–1734) found on the drawing. James Thornhill was a painter of the Italianate baroque style. He was identified through an inscribed text on an attached piece of paper ( is now lost due to re-mounting in 1964) on the verso side of the drawing.

No 27 Given me by Sr Ja: Thornhill. Oct 1724. JR

— Jonathan Richard Senior

The initials JR was misread as JC and incorrectly attributed to the art collection of Robert Clive, 1st Baron Clive. It was only after close inspection in 1988 that the inscription was attributed to Jonathan Richardson Senior.

=== Jonathan Richardson ===
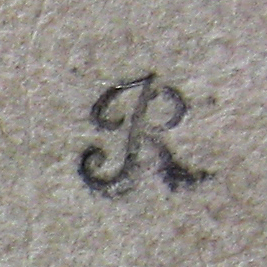
Collector mark for Jonathan Richard Senior (L.2184)

The collector mark for Jonathan Richardson Senior (1665–1745), is a "JR" monogram (Lugt. 2184).

Jonathan Richardson Sr. received this drawing from Thornhill and added to his art collection (catalogue no. 83). Richardson was a collector of 17th-century artwork, particularly the era of Lely. He was less than complementary when describing the drawing of Ruben's first wife:

[Her] face is one of the most disagreeable I have ever seen, and I am sure it is more so than was necessary for the likeness, however ugly she really was

— Jonathan Richardson

By the time Richardson died, he had amassed a large collection of no less than 4,947 drawings, part of which was sold by his son, Jonathan Richardson the Younger (1694–1771), in January 1747 (old style, 1746).

=== Honourable John Spencer ===
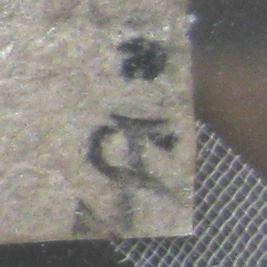
Collector mark for George John Spencer (L.1531)

The collector mark with initials J within the S and an x shaped asterisk above it (Lugt. 1531), belonged to The Honourable John Spencer (1708–1746), father of John Spencer, 1st Earl Spencer (1734–1783). His grandson George John Spencer, 2nd Earl Spencer (1758–1834), was associated with the mark after inheriting the collection.

The Spencers were a family of politicians and art collectors. The Honourable John Spencer was the founder of the collection, having inherited and added to the collection of his maternal grandmother Sarah Churchill, Duchess of Marlborough (1660–1744). George John Spencer was well known as a bibliophile due to his care of and additions to the library at Althorp. He was also a collector of early prints.

The collection of drawings was sold beginning 10 June 1811 in a sale lasting seven days. The sale contained:

Superb cabinet of drawings, the entire collection of a nobleman, formed with refined taste and judgment about the middle of the last century.

The sale also included the drawings of Rubens and van Dyck.

=== Robert Stayner Holford ===
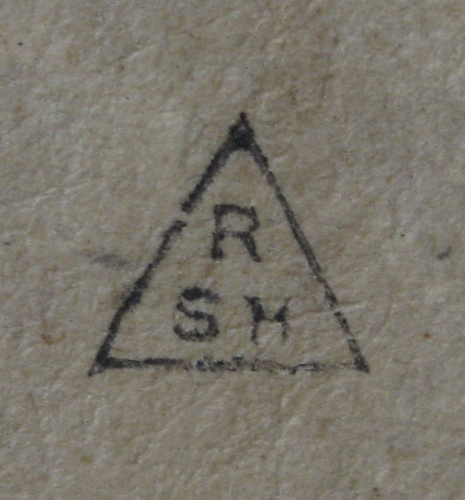
Collector mark for Robert Stayner Holford (L.2243)

The collector mark for Robert Stayner Holford (1808–1892) is the initials RSH contained within a triangle (Lugt. 2243).

Holford was considered one of the finest collectors of art and prints of his time. He acquired his collection of prints in the mid-19th century and benefited from the dispersion of the Aylesford collection.

Following the death of Holford in 1892, his collection of artwork, including the drawing (lot. 668) was put up for sale at Christie's between the 11 and 18 July 1893. The drawing was bought for the British Museum through dealers Desprez & Gutekunst and arrived at the Prints and Drawings department on 31 July 1893.

=== British Museum ===
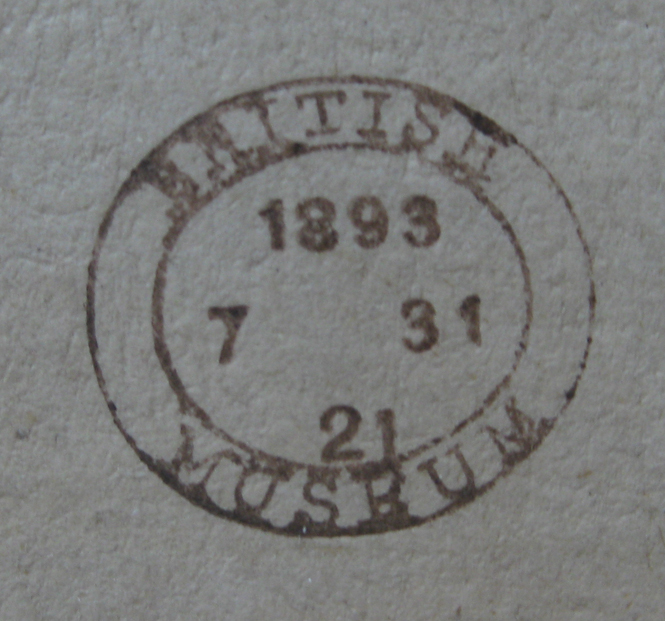
Collector mark for British Museum (L.302)

The British Museum collector mark (Lugt. 302) is specific for the Prints and Drawings department. It is oval in design with "British Museum" inscribed along the edge. The numbers within the oval denote the date of acquisition (clockwise from left; month, year, day) and item number (bottom).

== Exhibitions ==
Date	Location	Museum	Title of Exhibition	Catalogue No.	Ref.
1965	London	British Museum	Masterpieces of the Print Room	(no cat.)	
July–Dec 1974	London	British Museum	Portrait Drawings	88	
1977	London	British Museum	Rubens drawings and sketches	154	
1984	London	British Museum	Master Drawings & Watercolours	87	
Sept–Dec 2004	Vienna	Albertina	Peter Paul Rubens (1577–1640): The Drawings	81	
Jan–April 2005	New York	Metropolitan Museum of Art	Peter Paul Rubens (1577–1640): The Drawings	82	
