= Isabella Brant =

First wife of painter Peter Paul Rubens (1591–1626)

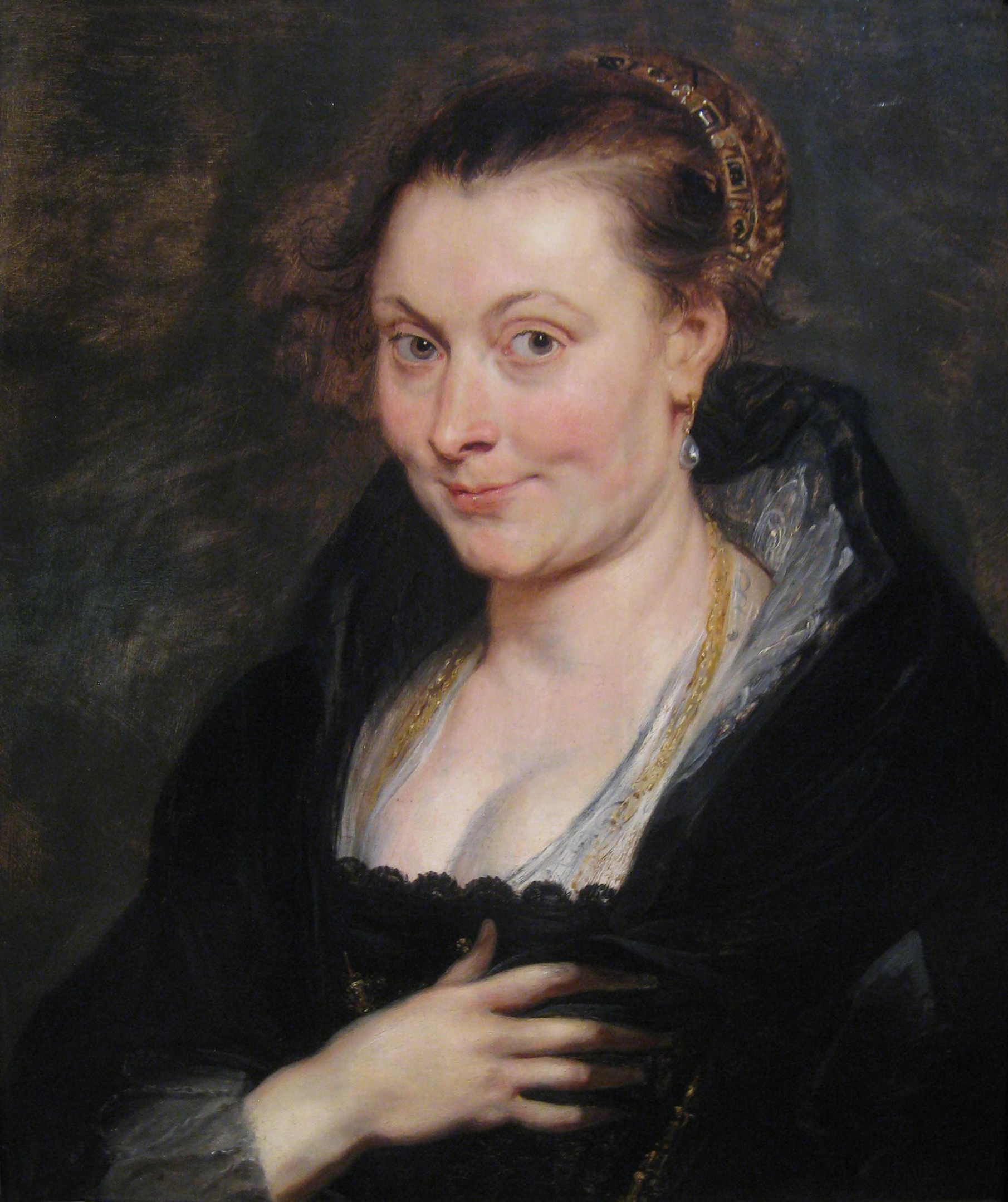
- Portrait of Isabella Brant by Rubens, c. 1620–1625 (Cleveland Museum of Art)
- Born: 1591
- Died: 15 July 1626 (aged 34)
- Spouse: Peter Paul Rubens (m. 1609)
- Children: Clara, Nicolaas, Albert

Isabella Brant (or Brandt; 1591 – 15 July 1626) was the first wife of the Flemish baroque painter Peter Paul Rubens. Rubens painted several portraits of her.

== Family ==
She was the eldest daughter of Jan Brant, a prominent city official in Antwerp, and Clara de Moy, daughter of Hendrik de Moy, secretary of the Antwerp city council. Her aunt Maria de Moy was married to Philip Rubens, brother of her future husband.

Isabella Brant married Peter Paul Rubens on 3 October 1609 in St. Michael's Abbey, Antwerp. They had three children: Clara (also called Clara Serena (1611-1623), Nicolaas, later Lord of Rameyen (1614-1657) and Albert (1618-1655). She was 34 years old when she died of the plague.

== Portrayals of Isabella Brant ==
Rubens portrayed Isabella Brant in multiple individual portrait paintings, family portraits and a drawing. He also used her as a model for female figures in his religious and mythological paintings such as the Virgin in the Virgin and Child in a Flower Garland and one of the nymphs in the Diana and Her Nymphs Departing for the Hunt

Rubens' studio assistant Anthony van Dyck also painted her portrait.

== Gallery ==
Isabella Brant and her children in art

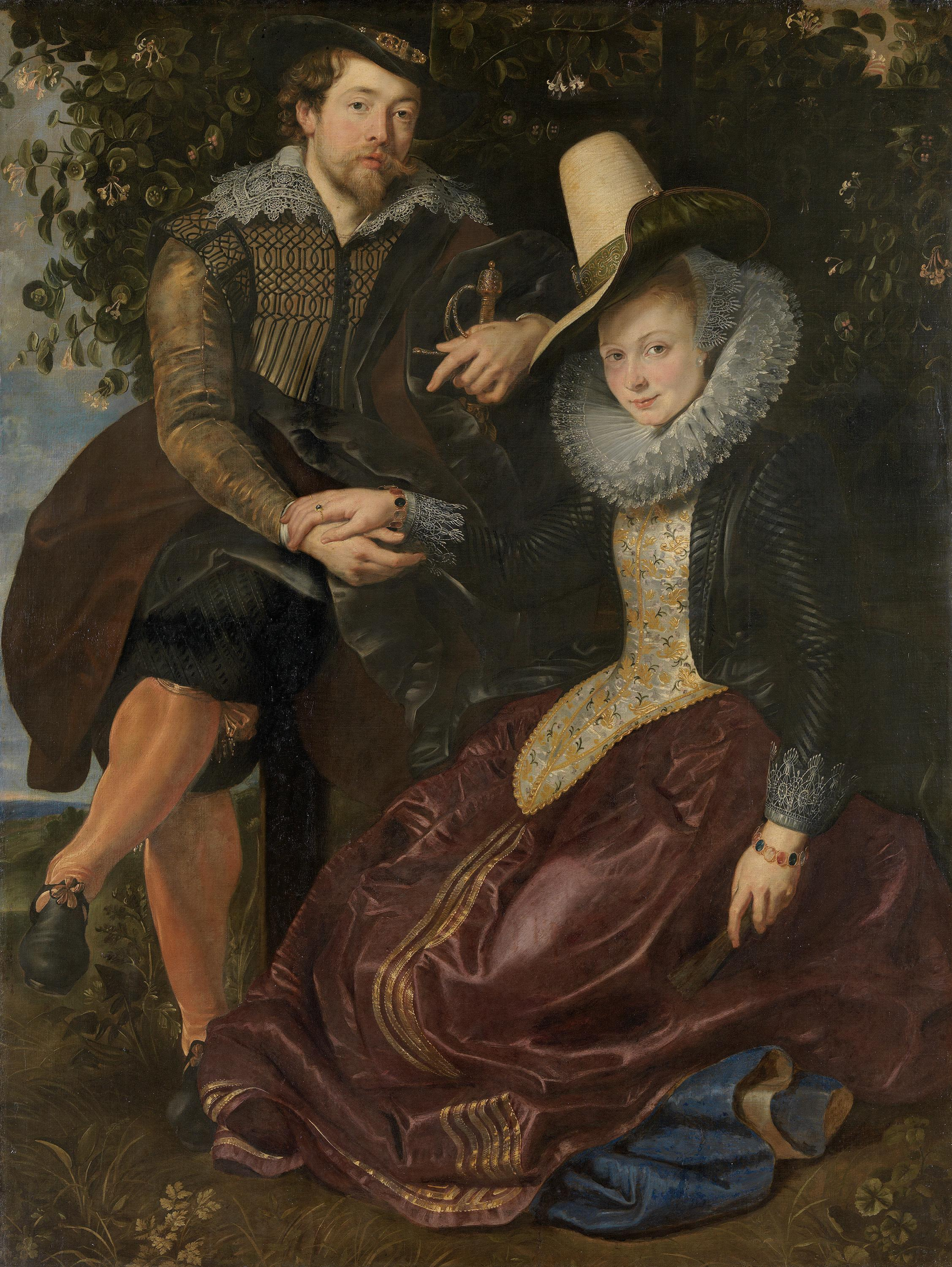
The Honeysuckle Bower by Rubens, c. 1609: the painter and Isabella Brant in the year of their marriage (Alte Pinakothek, Munich)

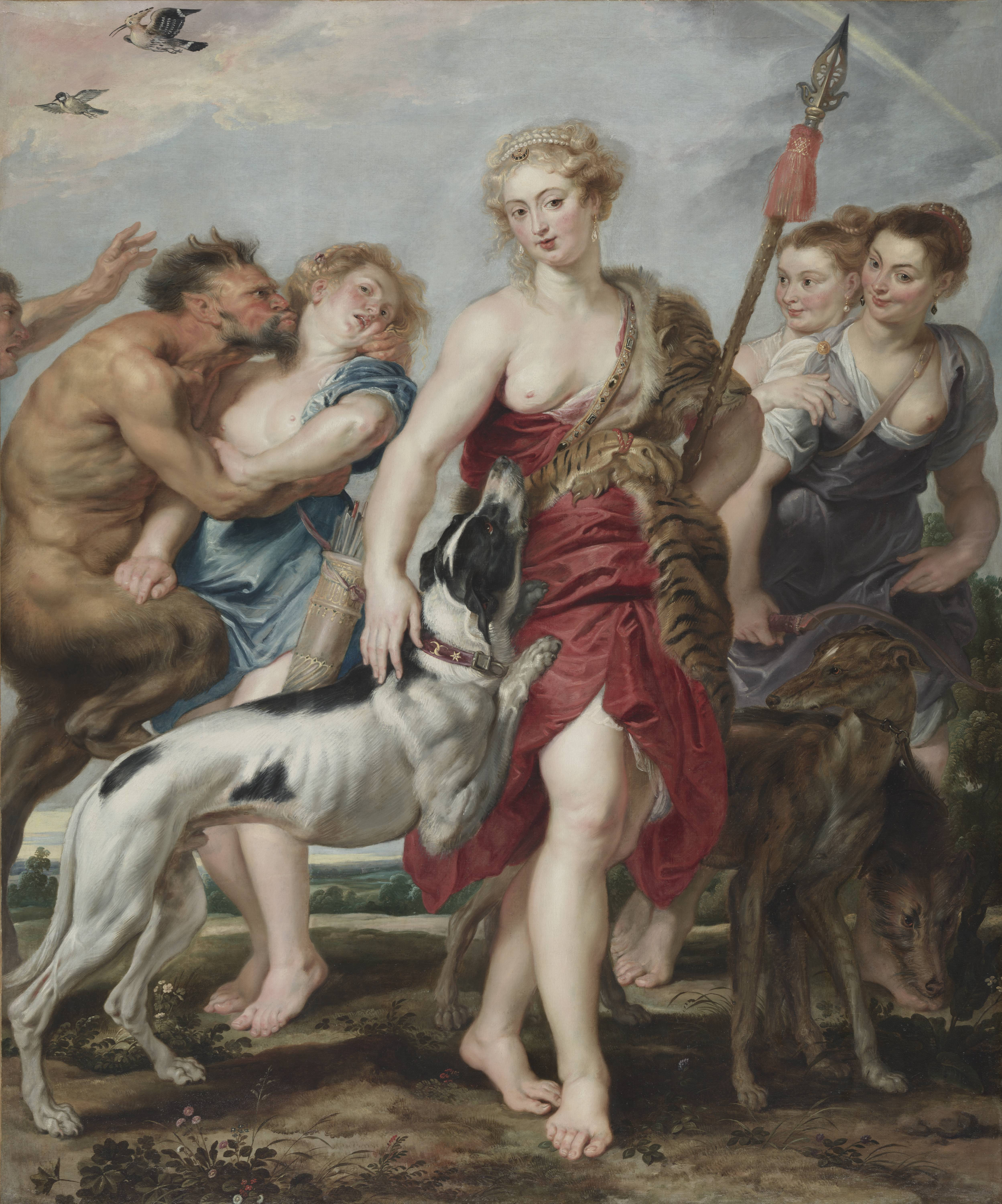
Diana and Her Nymphs Departing for the Hunt, by Rubens, 1609 Isabella Brant modelled the nymph on the far right.

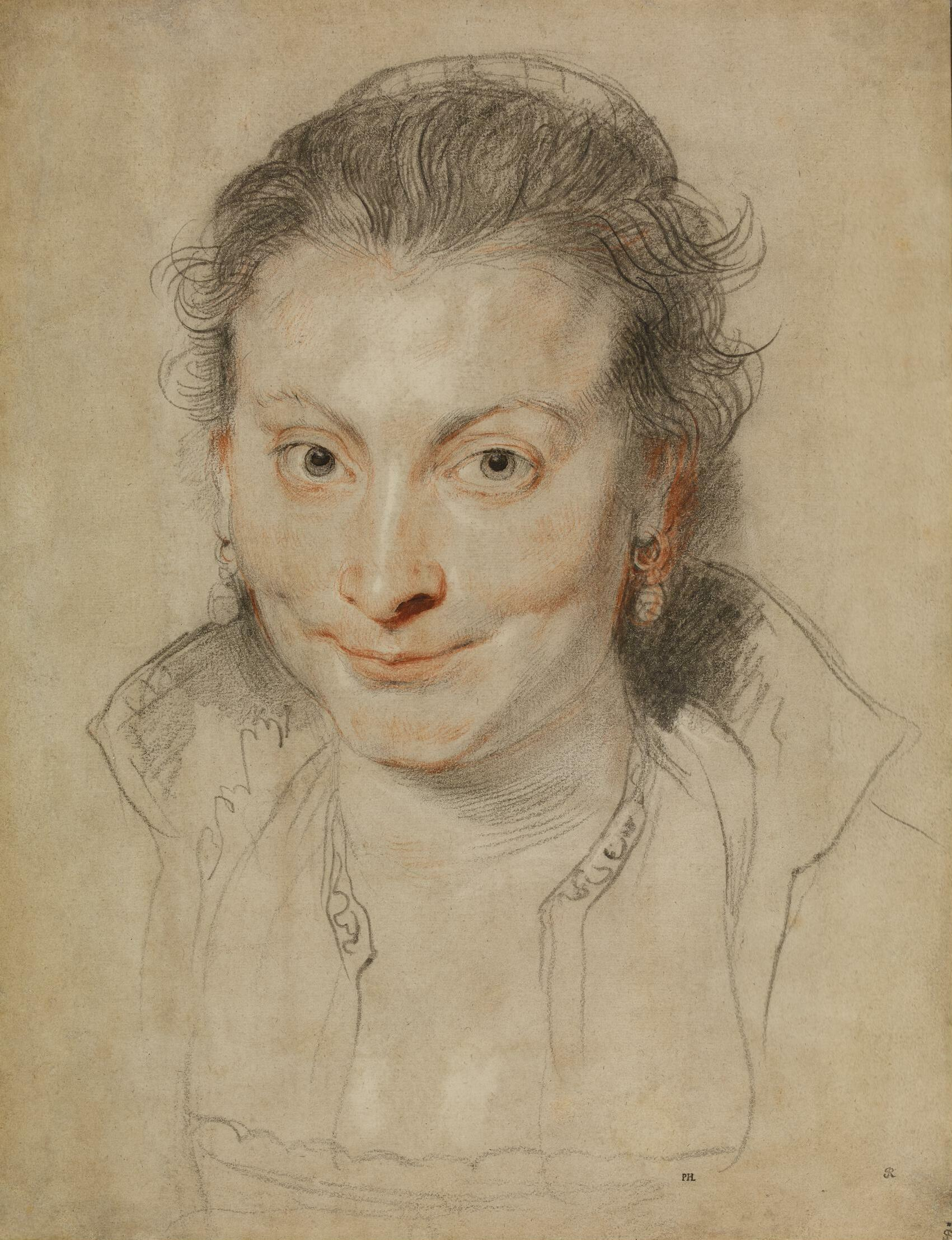
Portrait Drawing of Isabella Brant by Rubens, c. 1621 (British Museum, London)

Portrait of Isabella Brant by Anthony van Dyck, c. 1623–1626 (National Gallery of Art, Washington, D.C.)

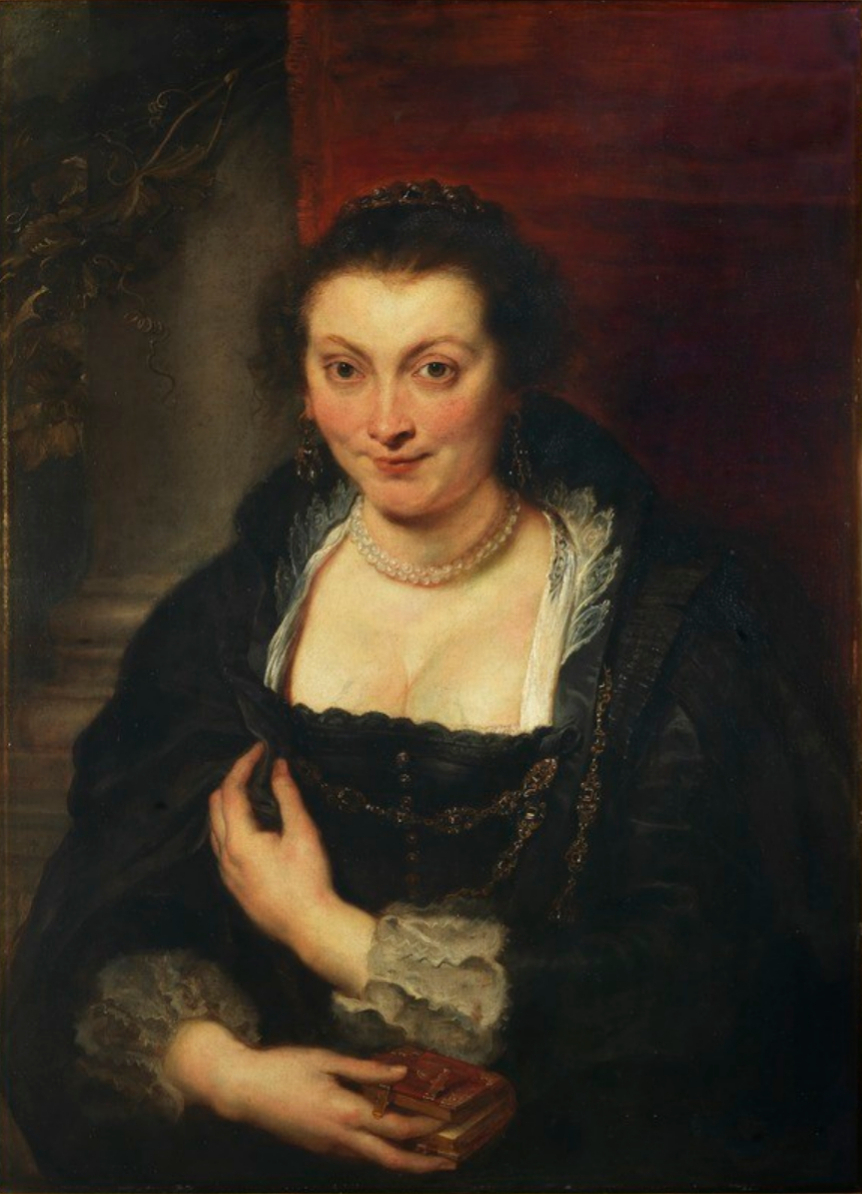
Portrait of Isabella Brant by Rubens, c. 1625 (Galleria degli Uffizi, Florence)

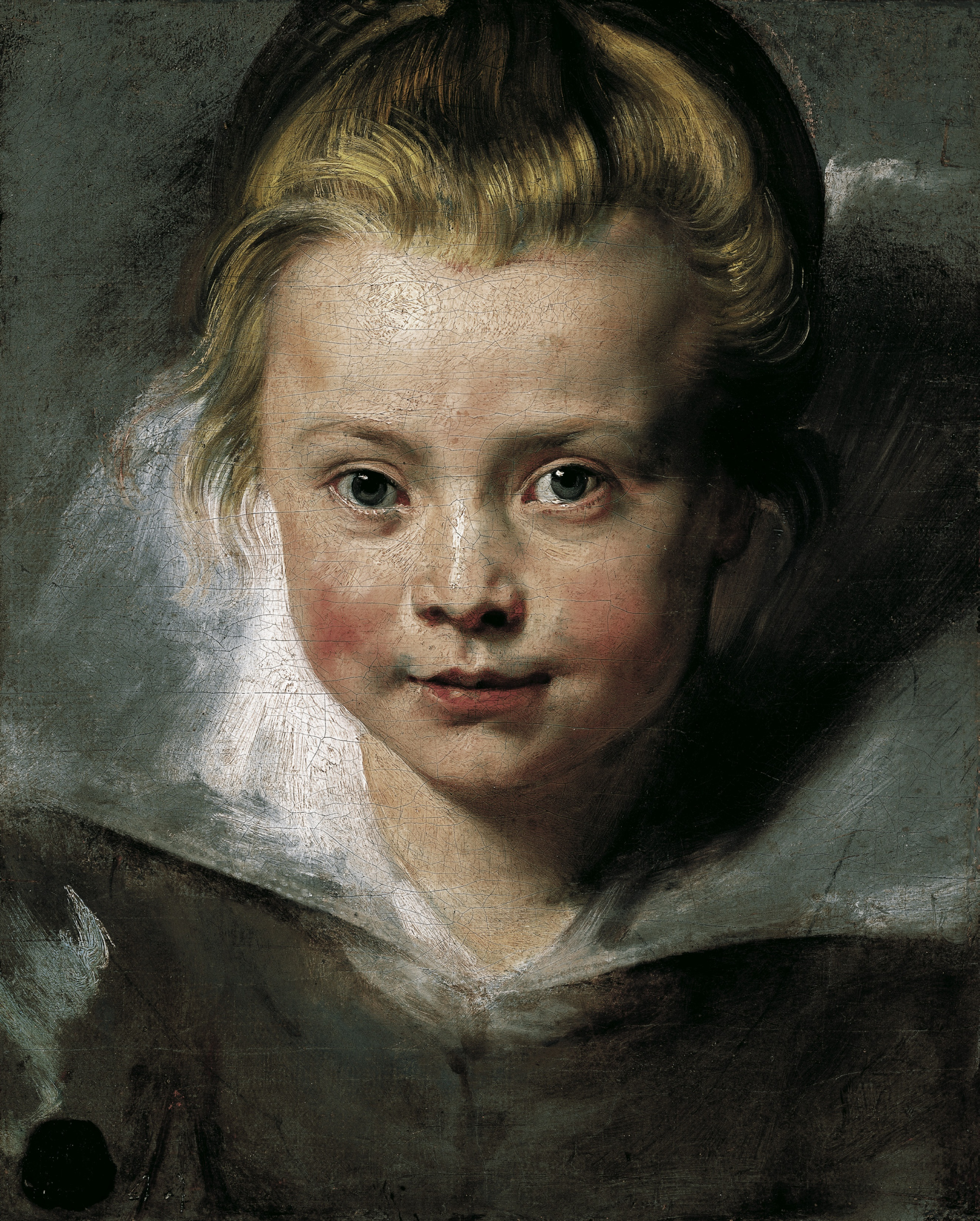
Clara Serena Rubens, 1616–1619 (Liechtenstein Museum)

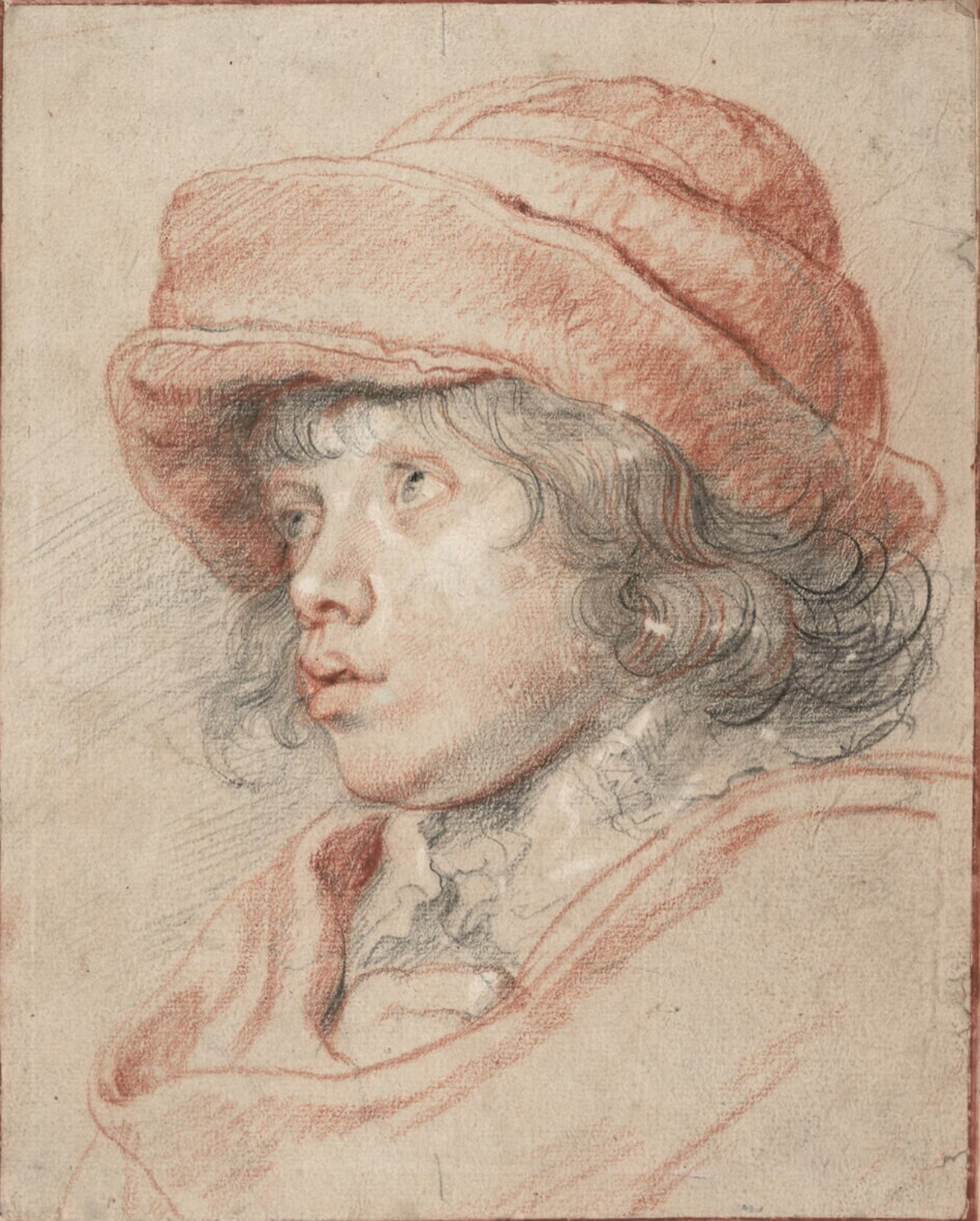
Portrait of Nicolaas Rubens by Rubens, c. 1626 (Albertina, Vienna)

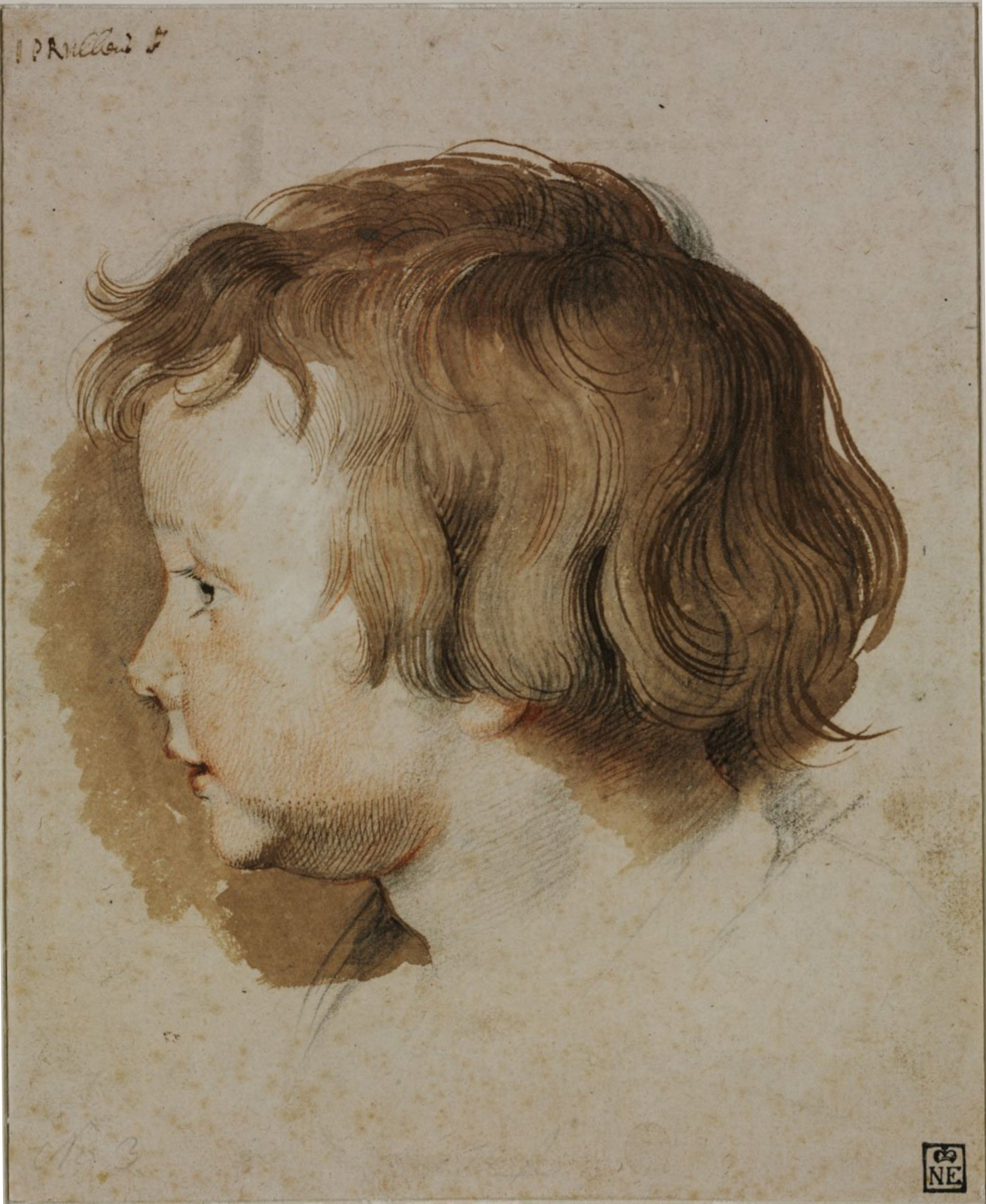
Albert Rubens, c. 1626 (Museum of Fine Arts (Budapest))
