= William Billers =

English haberdasher, Alderman, Sheriff and Lord Mayor of London

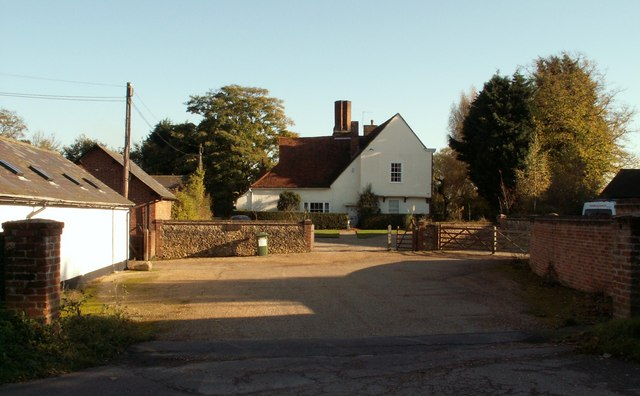
Thorley Hall, Thorley, Hertfordshire

Sir William Billers FRS (1689 – 15 October 1745) was an English haberdasher who was Alderman, Sheriff and Lord Mayor of London.

He was born in Thorley, Hertfordshire, where the Billers family, who originated from Kirby Bellars in Leicestershire, owned Thorley Hall and manor.

He became a London haberdasher and a member of the Haberdashers' Company, to whom he donated a painting entitled "The Wise Men's Offering" which hung in Haberdashers' Hall.

In 1720–21, he was elected joint Sheriff of the City of London and in 1733-34 elected 399th Lord Mayor of London. In 1722 he became an Alderman for Cordwainer Ward. In 1726 he was elected a Fellow of the Royal Society and was knighted in 1727.

He died in 1745 and was buried in Thorley church. He married Anne (c. 1711–1750), daughter of Sir Rowland Aynsworth and Sarah Fleet (daughter of Sir John Fleet, Lord Mayor of London in 1693), by whom he had two sons and four daughters: John, William, Martha, Anne, Elizabeth, and Maria. His two sons and daughter Martha predeceased him. His eldest daughter Anne, who married John Olmius (later Baron Waltham) was his eventual heiress.

After his death, his extensive library was auctioned by Christopher Cock at his house in the Great Piazza, Covent Garden on 22 November 1745.

Civic offices
Preceded by John Barber	Lord Mayor of London; 1733– 1734	Succeeded by Sir Edward Bellamy
