= Abraham Langford =

English auctioneer and playwright

Abraham Langford (1711–1774) was an English auctioneer and playwright.

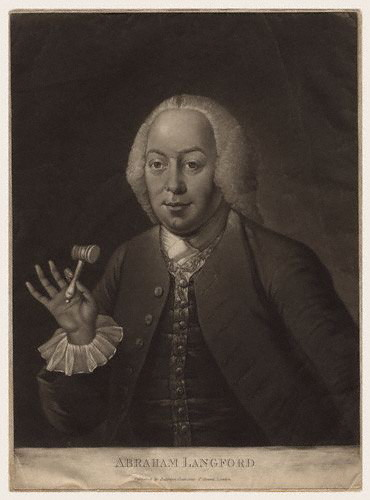
Abraham Langford, 18th century mezzotint.

== Life ==
He was born in the parish of St Paul, Covent Garden. As a young man he wrote for the stage, and was responsible, according to the Biographia Dramatica, for an 'entertainment' called 'The Judgement of Paris,' which was produced in 1730. In 1736 appeared a ballad-opera by him entitled 'The Lover his own Rival, as formed at the New Theatre at Goodman's Fields.' It was received indifferently, but was reprinted at London in 1753, and at Dublin in 1769.

By 1747 Langford was in partnership with Christopher 'Auctioneer' Cock (d. 1748), and in 1748 succeeded him at the auction-rooms in the north-eastern corner of the Piazza, Covent Garden. These rooms formed part of the house where Sir Dudley North died in 1691, and were later the site of the Tavistock Hotel.

The extent of Langford’s auctioneering business can be judged from the list of sales he organised in the month of April 1760 alone:
Mr Arthur Pond (Prints by Rembrandt)
William Draper, Esq. (Greek, Roman, English and Foreign coins, medals and medallions)
Paul Whichcote, Esq. (Household furniture, china, etc.)
Mr Joseph Ames, late Fellow of the Royal Society (Scarce printed books and curious manuscripts)
Mr Isaac du Hamel (Stock in trade of his jewellery and watchmaking business)
as well as various farms, tenements and a manor house.

All of this followed a two-day auction the previous month of more than 120 paintings by eminent artists, bronzes, busts, etc., acquired by the art dealer John Blackwood.

Abraham Langford died on 17 September 1774, and was buried on the 23rd in Old St. Pancras churchyard, near the north wall of the church. A long and grandiloquent epitaph was inscribed on both sides of his tomb. He left a large family.

Langford's successors at the Covent Garden auction-rooms included Henry Robins, father of another well-known auctioneer, George Henry Robins.

== Family ==
Langford's wife was Mary; her surname and the date of their marriage is not known. They had seven children, all baptised from 1738 to 1751: Mary Ann, Charlotte, Robert, Thomas, Louisa, Cock and Abraham. The first two were baptised at St Martin in the Fields, and the others at St Paul, Covent Garden, indicating a change of residence around 1742-43. Cock was baptised on 31 October 1748, the year that Langford’s partner Christopher Cock died.

== Notes ==
Attribution

This article incorporates text from a publication now in the public domain: "Langford, Abraham". Dictionary of National Biography. London: Smith, Elder & Co. 1885–1900.
