= List of private residents of Covent Garden =

The entries in this tabulation cover some 150 years in the 17th and 18th centuries, when the private residents of Covent Garden included many people of rank and note. They ranged from marquesses to barons, foreign ambassadors and members of parliament to physicians, surgeons, antiquaries, artists, authors and dramatists. Some of the later arrivals were auctioneers, such as Christopher Cock and Abraham Langford, who found rich sources for future sales amongst their neighbours.

Most of the entries are derived from The Piazza: Notable private residents in the Piazza, which in turn is based on Sheppard's Survey of London: Volume 36, Covent Garden. Other sources are noted where appropriate.

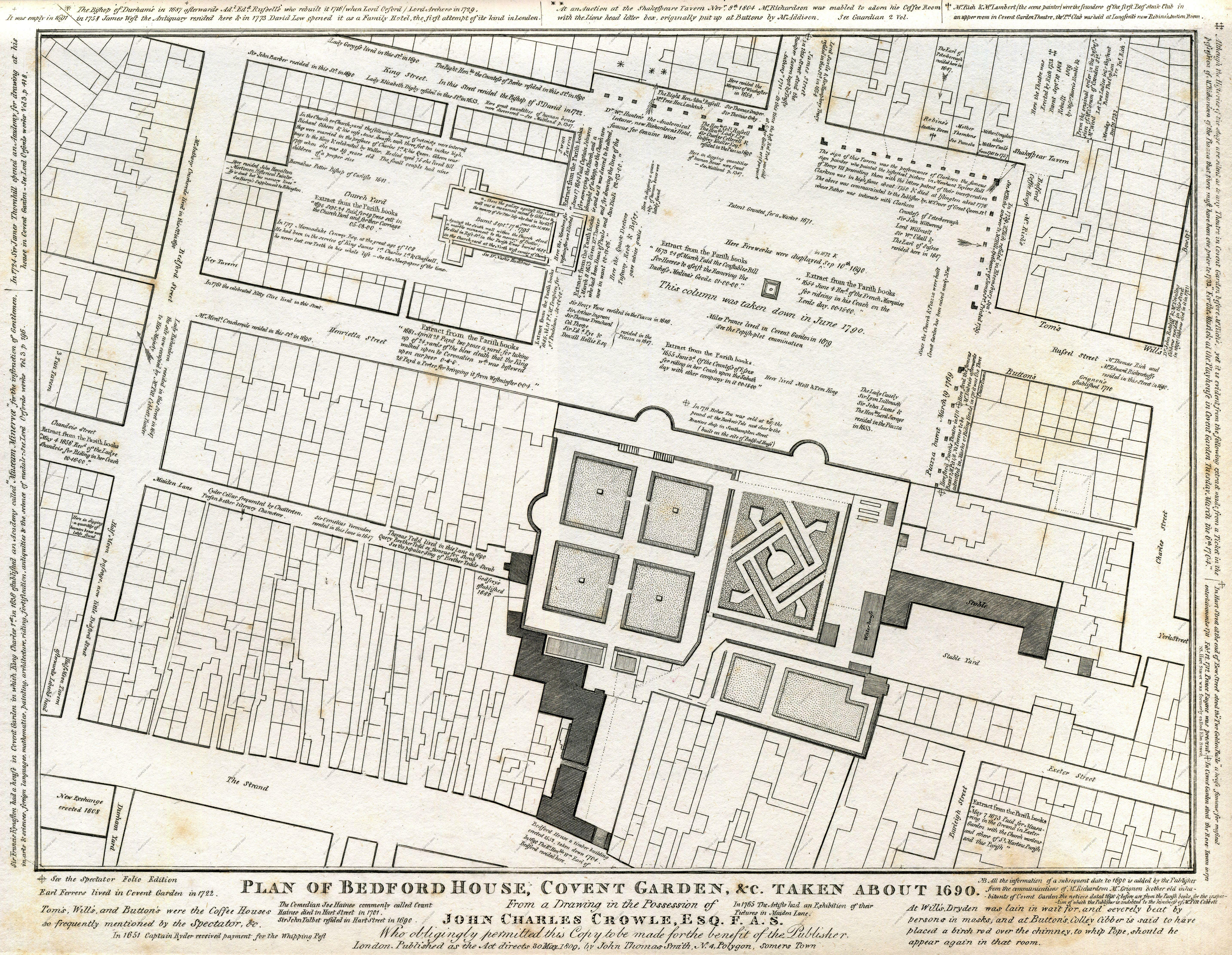
Fig. 1 This 1690 plan is annotated with the names of some earlier residents.

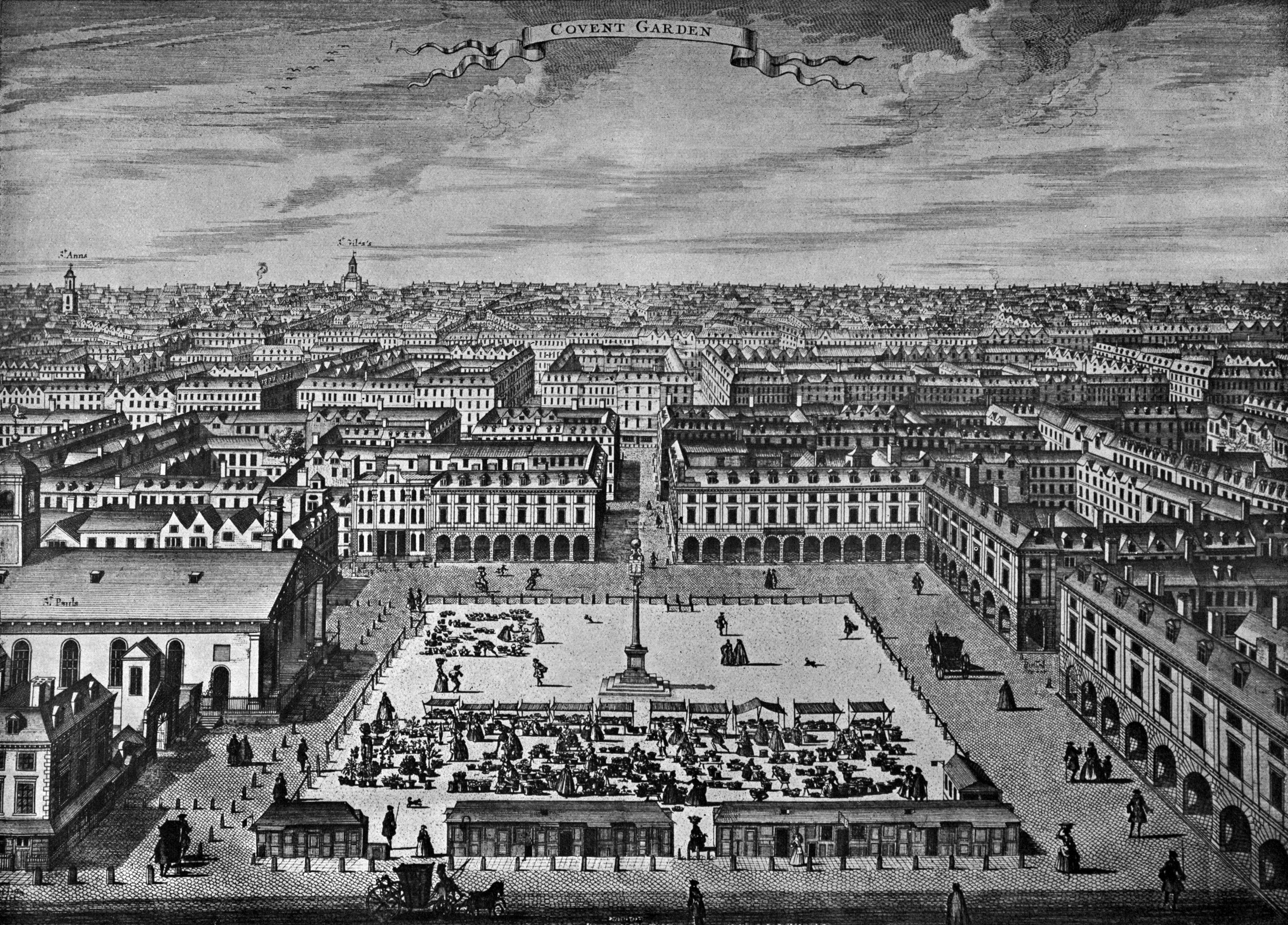
Fig. 2 Behind the column is James Street. Numbering was from the left of this, one per arch.

Address	Dates	Residents
No. 43 King Street	1637–43	William Paget, Baron Paget of Beaudesert
No. 43 King Street	1644	John Trenchard
No. 43 King Street	1645-7	Sir Henry Vane the younger
No. 43 King Street	c.1647	Sir Arthur Ingram
No. 43 King Street	c.1650-3	Dr. William Rant
No. 43 King Street	1655–61	Sir Edward Hales, baronet
No. 43 King Street	1662–5	Sir Kenelm Digby
No. 43 King Street	1666–80	Denzil Holles, first Baron Holles of Ifield
No. 43 King Street	1681–c.1688	Nathaniel Crew, third Baron Crew of Stene
No. 43 King Street	c.1690–1727	Hon. Edward Russell, first Earl of Orford
No. 1 Great Piazza	1637–41	Walter Montagu
No. 1 Great Piazza	1644	Sir William Waller
No. 1 Great Piazza	1645– c.1647	Sir Thomas Trenchard
No. 1 Great Piazza	c.1650–6	John Paulet, fifth Marquis of Winchester
No. 1 Great Piazza	1657–9	Nathaniel Fiennes
No. 1 Great Piazza	1660–1	Charles Gerard, first Baron Gerard of Brandon, first Earl of Macclesfield
No. 1 Great Piazza	1662–c.1703	Sir Thomas Draper, knight
No. 1 Great Piazza	c.1703–17	Lady Mary Draper
No. 1 Great Piazza	1718–23	Sir Harry Ashurst
No. 1 Great Piazza	1749–1760	William Hunter
No. 2 Great Piazza	1639–41	Sir John Harper
No. 2 Great Piazza	1641–5	Lady Mansell
No. 2 Great Piazza	c.1647–50	Zouch Tate
No. 2 Great Piazza	1650–65	Mrs. [Catherine] Tate, wife of Zouch
No. 2 Great Piazza	1666–8	Sir Charles Cotterell, knight
No. 2 Great Piazza	1676–85	Sir Richard Temple, baronet
No. 2 Great Piazza	1686–92	Prosper Henricus Lankrink
No. 2 Great Piazza	1707–8	Lord 'Fitz-Williams'
No. 2 Great Piazza	1708–11	Lord Falconbridge
No. 2 Great Piazza	1713	Lord Powis
No. 2 Great Piazza	1717–20	Sir John Cotton
No. 2 Great Piazza	1721	Dr. Noel Broxholme
No. 3 Great Piazza	1639–43	John Mordaunt, first Earl of Peterborough
No. 3 Great Piazza	1658–63	Lady 'Holborne'
No. 3 Great Piazza	1664–70	William Broun(c)ker, second Viscount Brouncker
No. 3 Great Piazza	1671–5	Marchioness of Clanricarde
No. 3 Great Piazza	1676	Viscountess 'Muscree'
No. 3 Great Piazza	1677–91	Sir Thomas Orby
No. 3 Great Piazza	1692–1713	John Closterman
No. 3 Great Piazza	1714–c.1734	Edward Gouge
No. 3 Great Piazza	c.1736–53	Hamlet Winstanley
No. 4–5 Great Piazza	1640–c.1641	Sir Thomas Culpeper the elder
No. 4–5 Great Piazza	1652–9	Lady 'Calveley'
No. 4–5 Great Piazza	1677–9	Gregory King
No. 6–7 Great Piazza	1638–40	Sir William Alexander, first Earl of Stirling
No. 6-7 Great Piazza	1640–4	Sir Henry Wallop
No. 6-7 Great Piazza	1645–c.1647	Robert Wallop
No. 6-7 Great Piazza	1653–4	Sir Lionel Tollemache
No. 6-7 Great Piazza	1655–7	Edmund Dunch
No. 6-7 Great Piazza	1658–60	Viscount Burnell
No. 6-7 Great Piazza	1663–90	Hon. Edward Russell
No. 6-7 Great Piazza	1691–c.1698	Robert, Lord Russell
No. 8 Great Piazza	1636–40	Thomas Killigrew
No. 8 Great Piazza	1640–1	Philip Wharton, fourth Baron Wharton
No. 8 Great Piazza	c.1647	Henry Mordaunt, second Earl of Peterborough
No. 8 Great Piazza	c.1651–7	Sir David Watkins, knight
No. 8 Great Piazza	1658–60	Lady Watkins
No. 8 Great Piazza	1661–2	Thomas Killigrew
No. 8 Great Piazza	1663–c. 1673	Aubrey de Vere, twentieth Earl of Oxford
No. 8 Great Piazza	c.1675	Resident envoy of the Republic of Venice
No. 8 Great Piazza	1676–93	Sir William Walter
No . 8 Great Piazza	1694–c.1698	Lady Knightley
No. 8 Great Piazza	c.1699	Rt. Hon. Lord James Russell
No. 8 Great Piazza	c.1702–1726	Thomas Murray
No. 9–10 Great Piazza	1640–3	Robert Holborne
No. 9–10 Great Piazza	c.1647	Colonel Thorp(e)
No. 9–10 Great Piazza	c.1651–71	Lord Lucas
No. 9–10 Great Piazza	1718–20	Thomas Grey, second Earl of Stamford
No. 9–10 Great Piazza	1720–30	Hon. Edward Wortley Montagu
No. 9-10 Great Piazza	1731-1748	Christopher Cock, auctioneer
No. 9-10 Great Piazza	1747-	Abraham Langford, auctioneer
No. 9-10 Great Piazza	1790-	Henry Robins and brother John; and later, George Henry Robins, Henry's son; all auctioneers.
No. 10–11 Great Piazza	1637–9	Sir Thomas Littleton, knight
No. 10–11 Great Piazza	1639–43	Sir John Winter
No. 10–11 Great Piazza	c.1651–80	Sir Peter Lely
No. 10–11 Great Piazza	1682–5	Thomas Hawker
No. 10–11 Great Piazza	1686–c.1694	Roger North
No. 10–11 Great Piazza	c.1698	Lady North
No. 10–11 Great Piazza	1753–5	Charles Macklin
No. 12 Great Piazza	1637–c.1673	Sir Edmund/Edward Pye
No. 12 Great Piazza	c.1675–93	Lady Katherine Pye
No. 12 Great Piazza	1694–1720	Matthew Aylmer, Baron Aylmer
No. 12 Great Piazza	1720–2	Sir John Norris
No. 12 Great Piazza	1722–34	Sir James Thornhill
No. 12 Great Piazza	c.1736–41	George Douglas, fourth Baron Mordington
No. 13–14 Great Piazza	1635–43	Sir Edward Sydenham
No. 13-14 Great Piazza	1637–43	Sir Charles Gawdy
No. 13-14 Great Piazza	1638–43	Lady Cooke
No. 13-14 Great Piazza	1644–52	Denzil Holles, first Baron Holles of Ifield
No. 13-14 Great Piazza	c.1645	? Sir William Constable
No. 13-14 Great Piazza	c.1645	? Edward Montague
No. 13-14 Great Piazza	1656	Mildmay Fane, second Earl of Westmorland
No. 13-14 Great Piazza	1656–63	Sir Edward Ford
No . 13-14 Great Piazza	1664	Charles Stuart, sixth Duke of Lennox, third Duke of Richmond
No . 13-14 Great Piazza	1668	Swedish ambassador
No. 13-14 Great Piazza	1669–79	Colonel John Strode
No. 13-14 Great Piazza	1669–c.1673	Countess Dowager of Peterborough
No. 13-14 Great Piazza	c.1675–6	Unspecified foreign diplomatic envoy
No. 13-14 Great Piazza	1679–86	Elizabeth, Lady Dacres, later Countess of Sheppey
No. 13-14 Great Piazza	1686–9	Edward Howard, fifth Earl of Carlisle
No. 13-14 Great Piazza	1690–2	Dutch ambassador
No. 13-14 Great Piazza	c.1702–14	George Dodington
No. 13-14 Great Piazza	c.1720–25	George Bubb Dodington, later first Baron Melcombe
No. 13-14 Great Piazza	1726–32	Dr. Douglas
No. 15 Great Piazza (back house)	1743–60	John Rich
No. 15 Great Piazza	1761–7	Priscilla Rich
No. 15 Great Piazza	1769	William Powell
No. 15 Great Piazza	1769–1771	Elizabeth Powell
No. 15 Great Piazza	1772–4	George Colman the elder
No. 16–17 Great Piazza	1636–c.1641	Sir Edmund Verney the elder
No. 16-17 Great Piazza	c.1643	Sir Peter Ingram
No. 16-17 Great Piazza	1644–7	Countess of Peterborough
No. 16-17 Great Piazza	c.1651–7	Sir Humphrey Tracy
No. 16-17 Great Piazza	1659–63	Sir Robert Bowles
No. 16-17 Great Piazza	1664–6	Mountjoy Blount, first Earl of Newport
No. 16-17 Great Piazza	1679	Lady Dacres
No. 16-17 Great Piazza	1680	Nathaniel Crew, third Baron Crew
No. 16-17 Great Piazza	1682–c.1702	Sir Godfrey Kneller, first baronet
No. 16-17 Great Piazza	1727–c.1734	Arthur Pond
No. 18–19 Great Piazza with No. 13 Russell Street	1637–c.1641	Lady Hobart ('Hubbert')
No. 18–19 Great Piazza with No. 13 Russell Street	1652	Doctor Denton
No. 18–19 Great Piazza with No. 13 Russell Street	1679–1728	James St. Amand a
No. 1 Little Piazza	1640–3	Sir Thomas Hanmore
No. 1 Little Piazza	1647	Sir John Wittwrong [sic]
No. 2 Little Piazza	1647	Henry Wilmot, second Viscount Wilmot, later first Earl of Rochester
No. 2 Little Piazza	c.1651	Earl of 'Kileare'
No. 2 Little Piazza	1659	Duke of Florence
No. 2 Little Piazza	1660–4	Earl of Meath
No. 2 Little Piazza	1666–70	Sir James Barkman Leyenberg
No. 2 Little Piazza	c.1674	Sir Richard Temple, baronet
No. 3 Little Piazza	1640– c.1647	Sir William Uvedale
No. 3 Little Piazza	c.1651	Sir William Plater
No. 3 Little Piazza	1653	Lord Savage
No. 3 Little Piazza	1654	Lady 'Savidge'
No. 3 Little Piazza	1655	Sir William Parkhurst
No. 3 Little Piazza	1656	Countess Ancrum
No. 3 Little Piazza	1657–61	Jane, Lady Angier
No. 3 Little Piazza	1663	Murrough O'Brien, first Earl of Inchiquin
No. 3 Little Piazza	1664–5	Sir Edward Ford
No. 4 Little Piazza	1691–2	William De Ryck
No. 4 Little Piazza	c.1705–7	Thomas Hawker
No. 4 Little Piazza	1771–4	John Abraham Fisher
No. 1 Tavistock Row	1635–43	Thomas Savile, first Viscount Savile, first Earl of Sussex
No. 1 Tavistock Row	1644–c.1645	Henry Grey, Earl of Kent
No. 1 Tavistock Row	1660	Richard Boyle, second Earl of Cork, later first Earl of Burlington, and Arthur Annesley, first Earl of Anglesey
No. 1 Tavistock Row	1670–1	Sir John Colladon
No. 1 Tavistock Row	1672	Lady Cartwright
No. 1 Tavistock Row	c.1675–6	Countess of Manchester
No. 1 Tavistock Row	1677–84	William Petre, fourth Baron Petre
No. 2–3 Tavistock Row	1637–43	Sir Peter Temple
No. 2–3 Tavistock Row	1661	Lady Cranburne
No. 2–3 Tavistock Row	1662	Lady Griffin
No. 37 Henrietta Street	c.1650–8	Francis Clein
Henrietta Street	1761	Kitty Clive
No. 1 King Street	1639–c.1641	Francis Russell esq.
No. 1 King Street	1653–6	Sir James Bridgman
King Street	1690	Lady Gorgess
King Street	1690	Sir John Barber
King Street	1722	Bishop of St David
Maiden Lane	1647	Sir Cornelius Vermuyden
