= Prosper Henricus Lankrink =

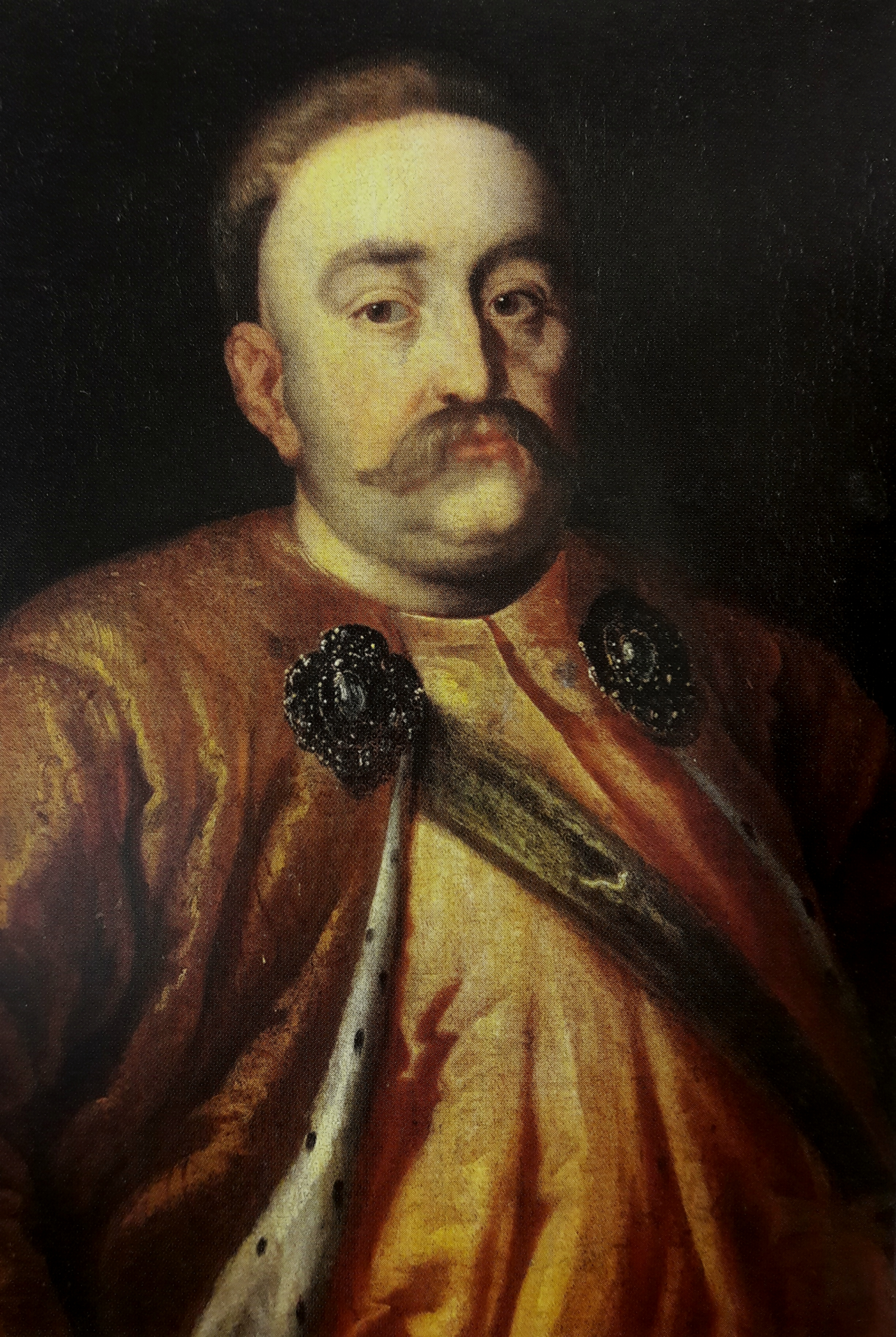
Fragment of portrait of King John III Sobieski by Prosper Henricus Lankrink, after 1676, Wawel Castle.

Prosper Henricus Lankrink (1628–1692) was a Flemish painter.

== Life ==
He was born at Antwerp. His father, a soldier of fortune, had come to that city from Germany, and there he obtained a colonel's commission, and died. The young Lankrink received a good education, and was intended by his mother for a monk, but discovering an inclination for painting, he was permitted to attend the Academy, where his progress was considerable, and was promoted by his having access to study the best pictures in one of the finest collections at Antwerp. Lankrink went afterwards to Italy and especially studied the works of Salvator Rosa.

He was patronised, among others, by Sir Edward Spragge [q. v.] and by Sir William Williams. The latter bought most of Lankrink's paintings, which were, however, all destroyed by fire. Lely employed Lankrink to paint the landscapes, flowers, and similar accessories in his portraits. His landscape paintings were much admired at the time: one, with a 'Nymph Bathing her Feet,' was engraved in mezzotint by John Smith. He painted a ceiling for Mr. Richard Kent at Corsham, Wiltshire.

On the death of his mother he came to England, in the reign of Charles II, and was patronized by Sir Edward Spragge, and more particularly by Sir William Williams, for whom he painted a great number of landscapes, which were destroyed when that gentleman's mansion was burned down. His pictures were in considerable estimation, and he was occasionally employed by Sir Peter Lely to paint his backgrounds. The scenery in his landscapes is wild and romantic, with rocks and broken grounds, in the style of Salvator Rosa. In later life he degenerated into an idle and dissolute character. He moved to No. 6 Great Piazza, Covent Garden in 1686 and died there in 1692. Prosper Henricus Lankrink was buried at his request under the porch of St. Paul's, Covent Garden.
