= Venus Blindfolding Cupid =

Painting by Titian

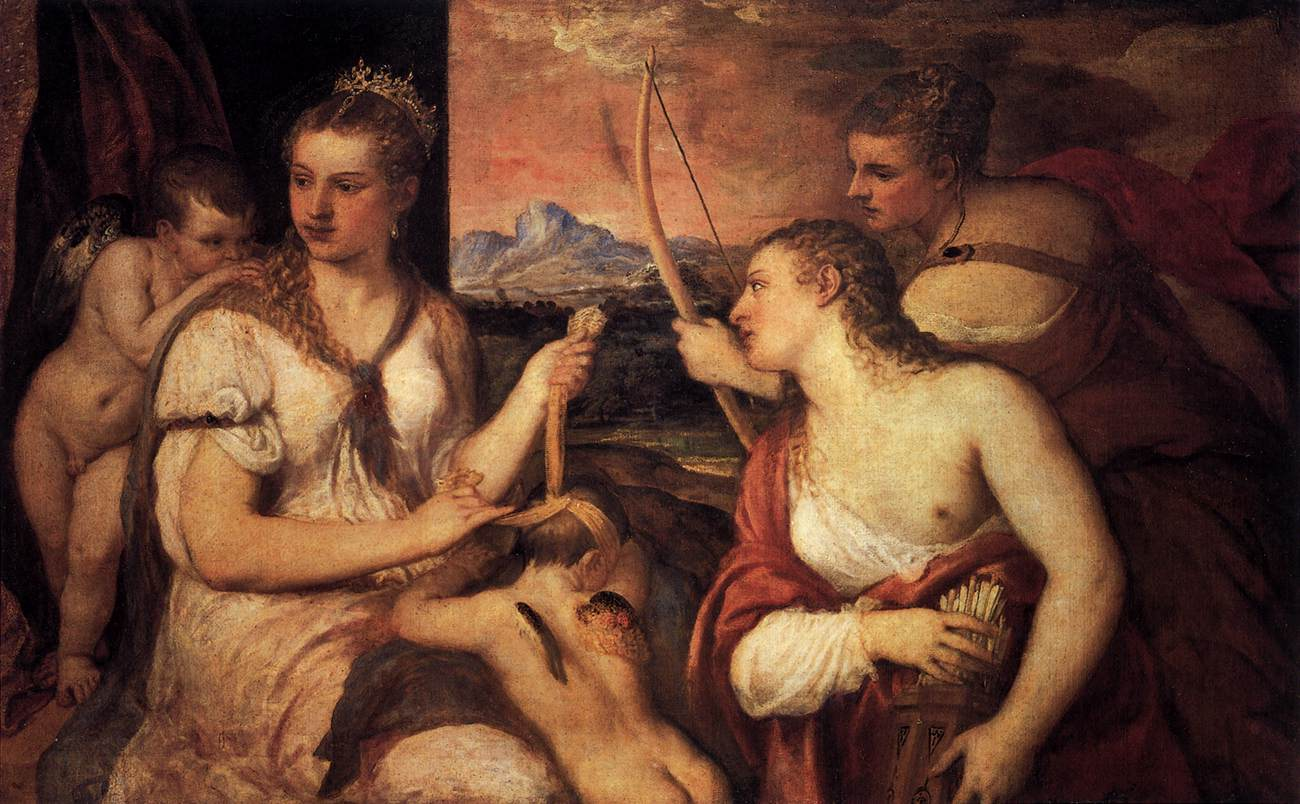
- Artist: Titian
- Year: c. 1565
- Medium: Oil on canvas
- Dimensions: 116 cm × 184 cm (46 in × 72 in)
- Location: Galleria Borghese; Rome

Venus Blindfolding Cupid is an oil on canvas painting by Titian, from c. 1565. It is held in the Galleria Borghese, in Rome.

The painting has been copied many times.

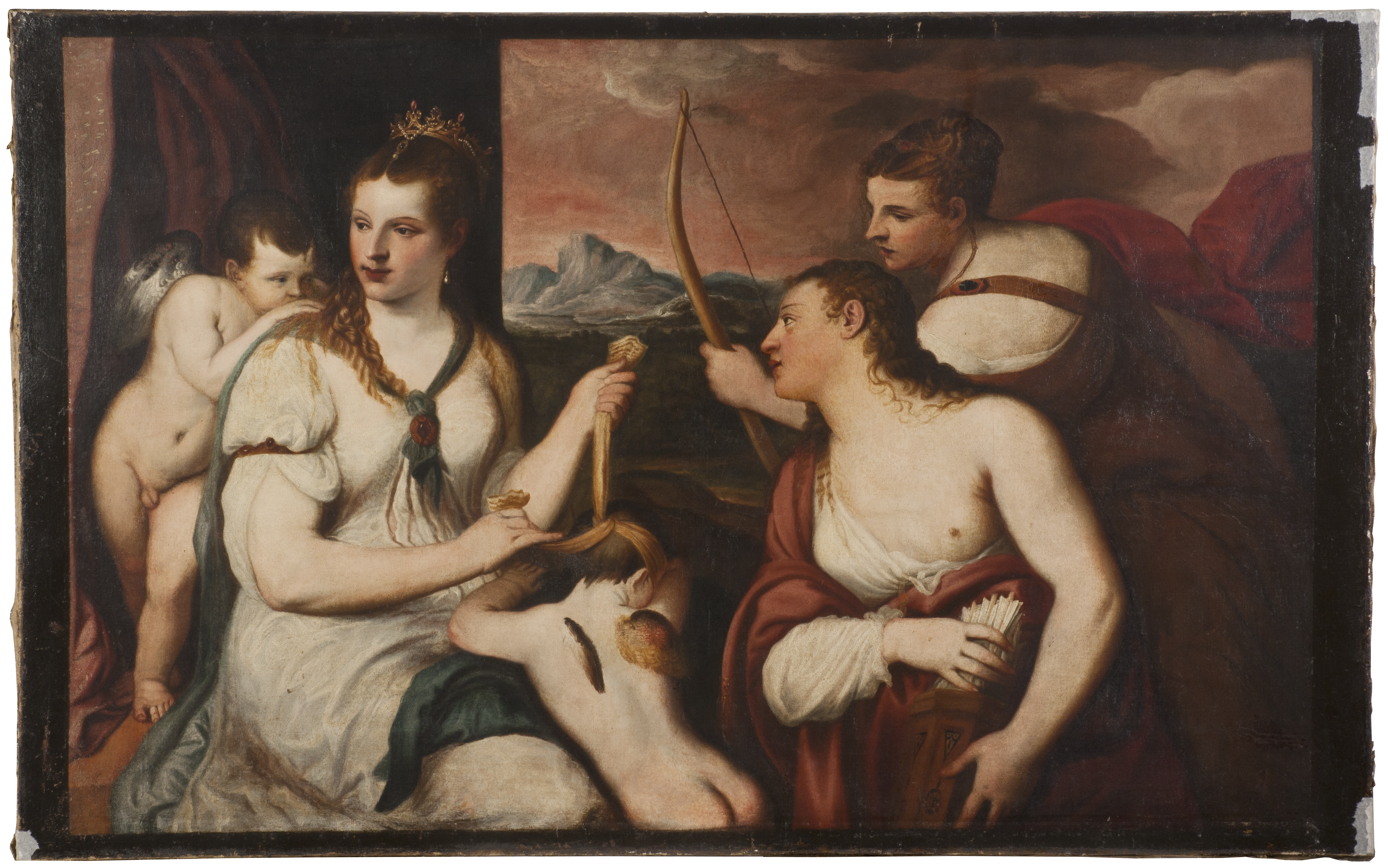
Version by Andrea Schiavone

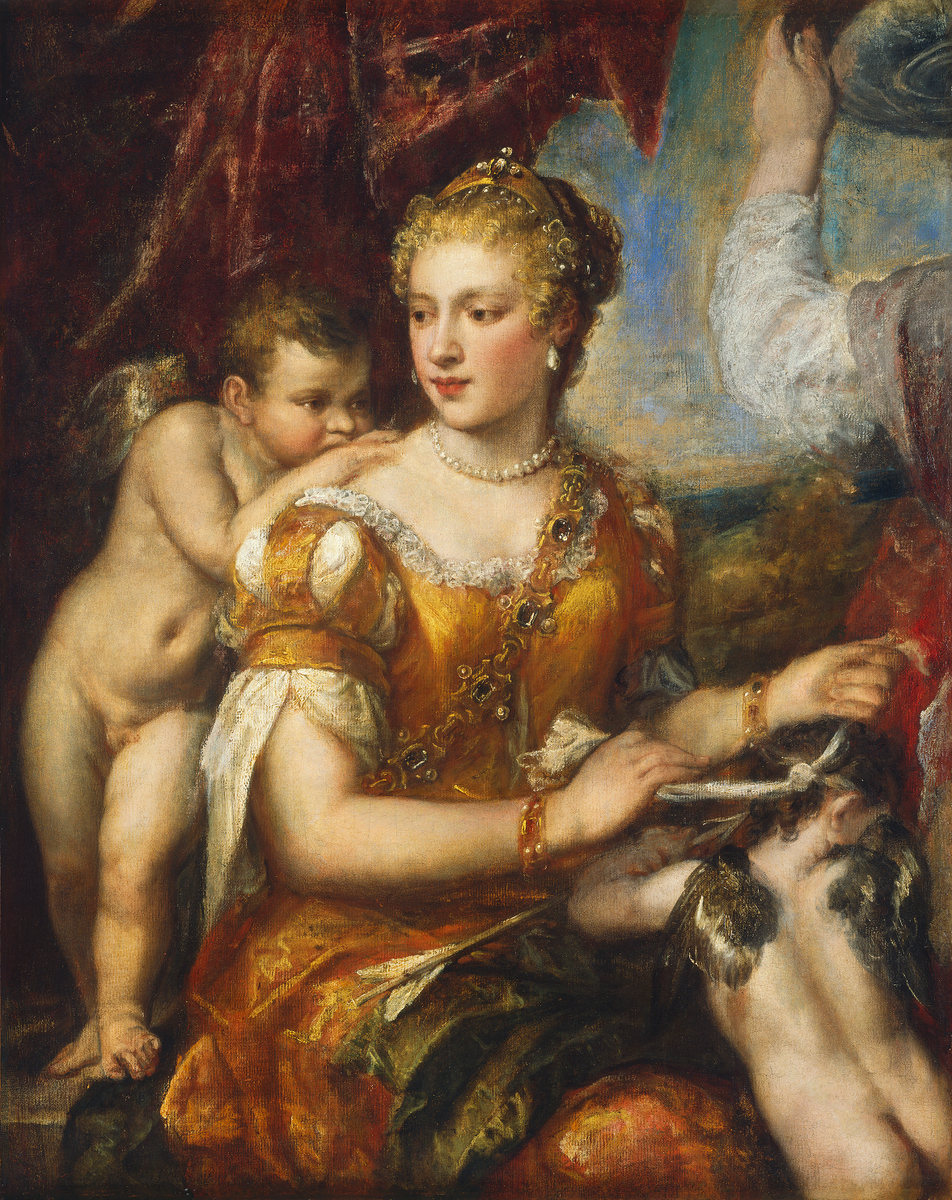
1560s copy by anonymous artist

This painting was formerly in the collection of Cornelis van der Geest and can be seen in two paintings of his art gallery in the 1630s by Willem van Haecht.

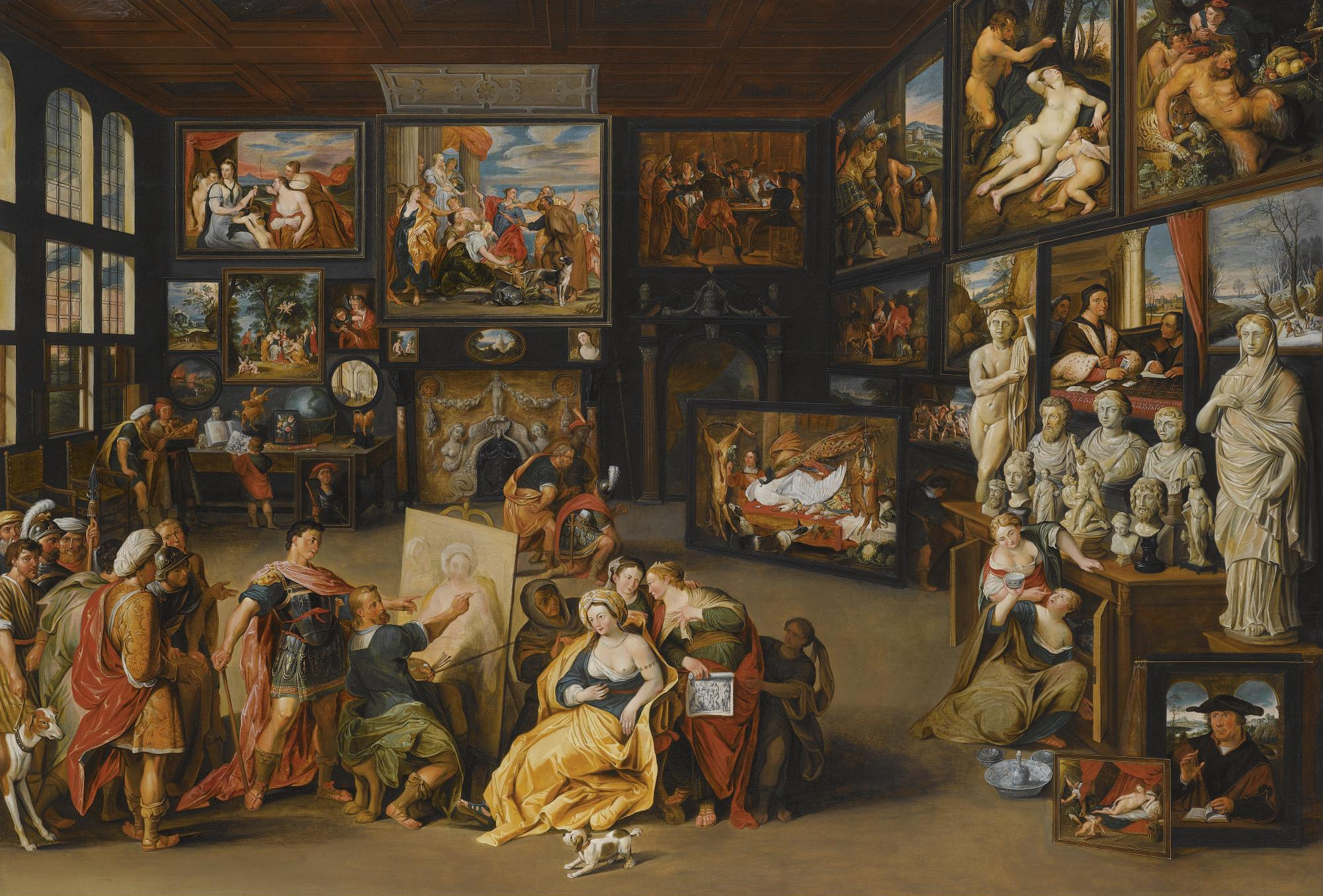
Alexander the Great visits the studio of Apelles, 1628-1637

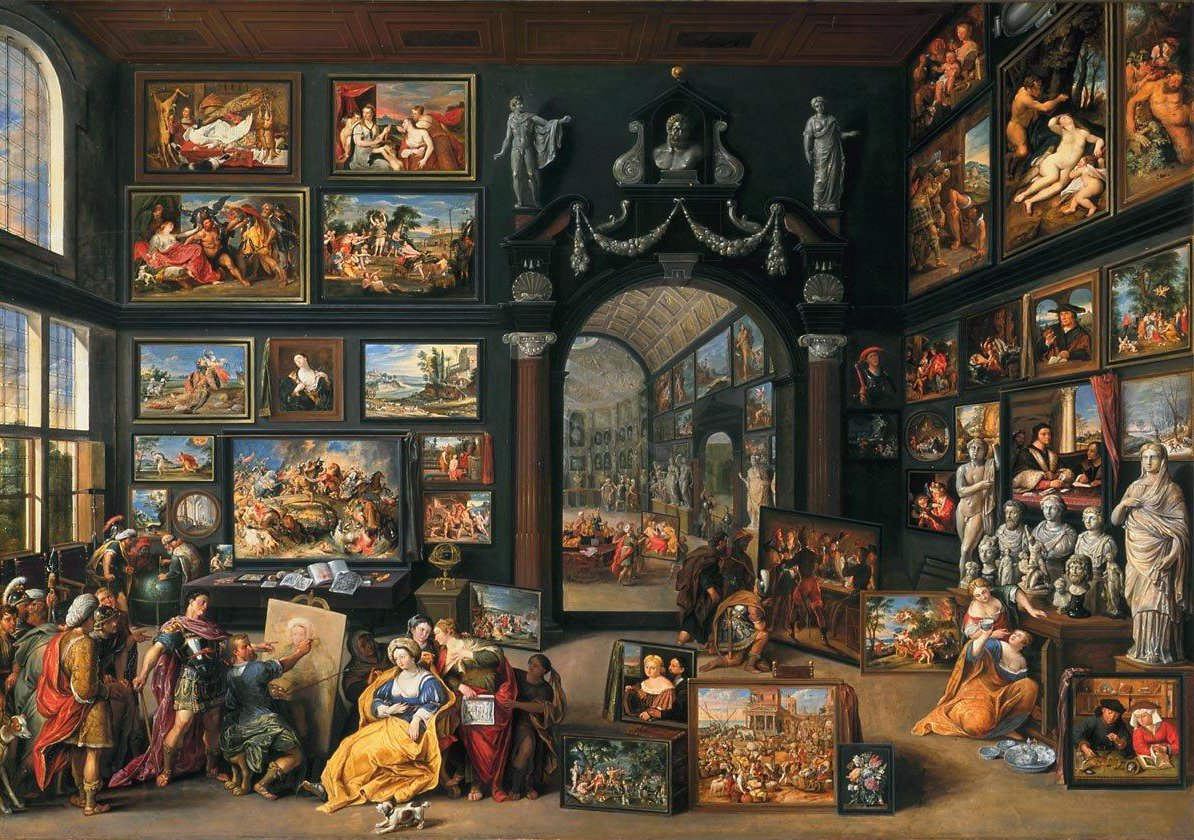
Apelles painting Campaspe, 1630

== See also ==
- List of works by Titian
