= Portrait of a Commander =

Painting by Peter Paul Rubens

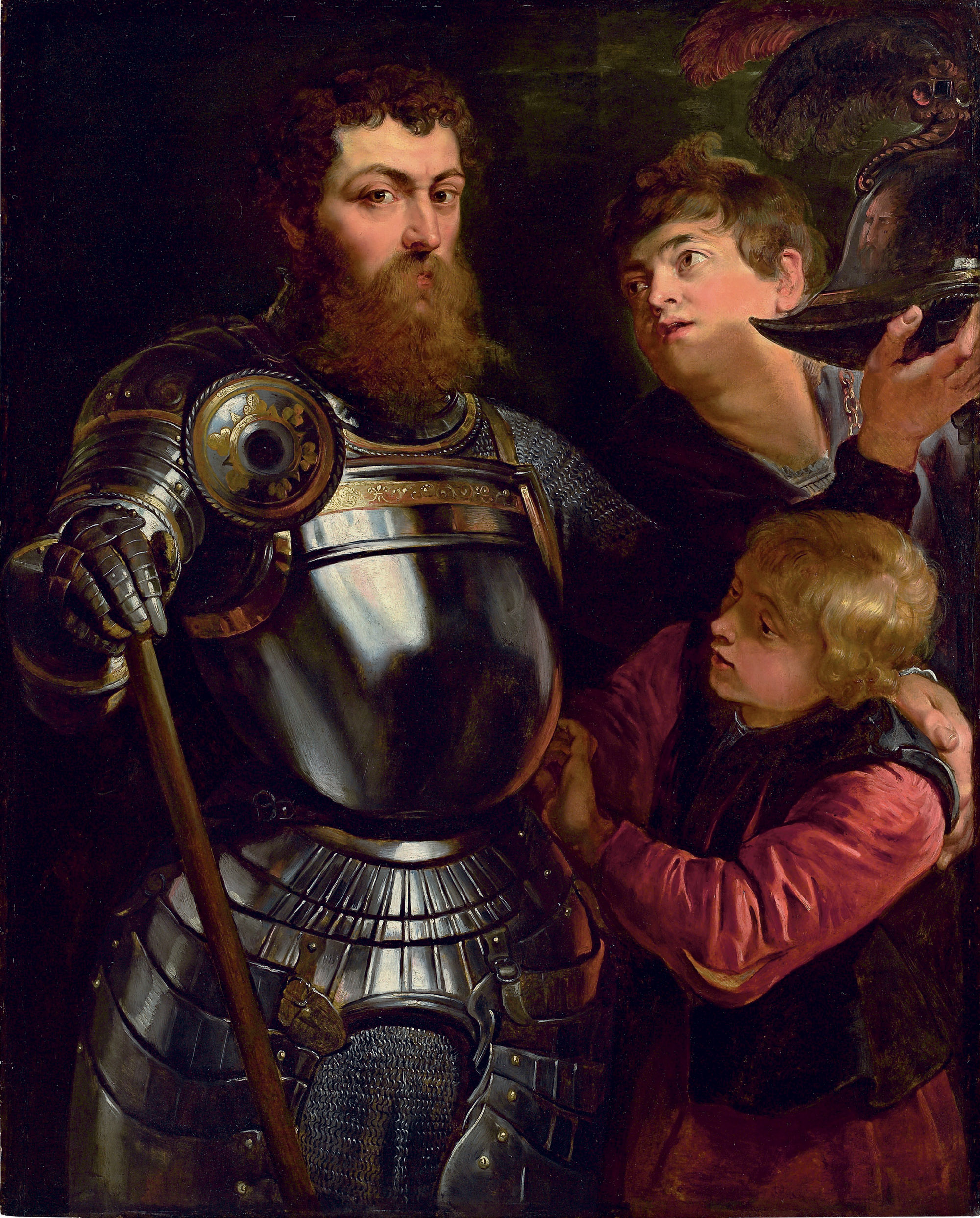
- Artist: Peter Paul Rubens (?)
- Year: c.1613 (?)
- Medium: oil on panel
- Dimensions: 122.6 cm × 98.2 cm (48.3 in × 38.7 in)
- Location: Metropolitan Museum of Art, New York

Portrait of a Commander or A Commander Being Dressed for Battle is a portrait of an unknown man in plate armour, by Peter Paul Rubens. In July 2010 it was sold for £9 million by Christie's after Sotheby's turned it down, suspecting its authenticity as a Rubens. In December 2011, the portrait was placed on loan with the Metropolitan Museum of Art in New York.

== Description ==
The painting, done in oil on panel, measures 48.25 × 38 3/8 in. (122.6 × 98.2 cm). It depicts a military commander, as shown by his baton, being dressed by pages. The identity of the commander is unknown, although Charles V, Cornelis van der Geest, and the Duke of Alba have all been identified as possible subjects. The Christie's cataloguer felt that the commander appears too idealized to be an actual person. The painting has been praised for its crisp and intense hue and the reflective properties of the armour. If by Rubens, it would have been painted around 1613.

== History ==
The provenance of the work before 1802 is uncertain, with Christie's adding "(possibly)" to almost every paragraph in their description, until it came into the possession of George Spencer, 2nd Earl Spencer by 1802. After that it remained the property of the Spencer family until 2010, when Charles Spencer, 9th Earl Spencer, brother of Diana, Princess of Wales, decided to auction it with nearly 800 other artworks not deemed core to the Althorp collection in order to raise funds for restoration work at the estate. It was sold at the lower end of the Christie's estimate of between £8m and £12m to Konrad Bernheimer for £9 million ($13.7 million). This is the second highest price ever paid for Rubens' work at auction, after the Massacre of the Innocents, now in Toronto, which was sold at Sotheby's in London on 10 July 2002, for £49.5 million to Canadian businessman and art collector Kenneth Thomson, 2nd Baron Thomson of Fleet.

== Authenticity ==
For more than 100 years, it was attributed to the "School of Porbus". It was not attributed to Rubens until after World War II. According to Brian Sewell, it is an "uncomfortable Rubens" and the attribution "doesn't quite ring true". A panel of academics employed by Christie's examined the portrait and ultimately concluded that the painting is a genuine Rubens.

The Gallery of Cornelis van der Geest, by Willem van Haecht shows this painting hanging on the rear wall.
