= Cornelis van der Geest =

Belgian spice merchant

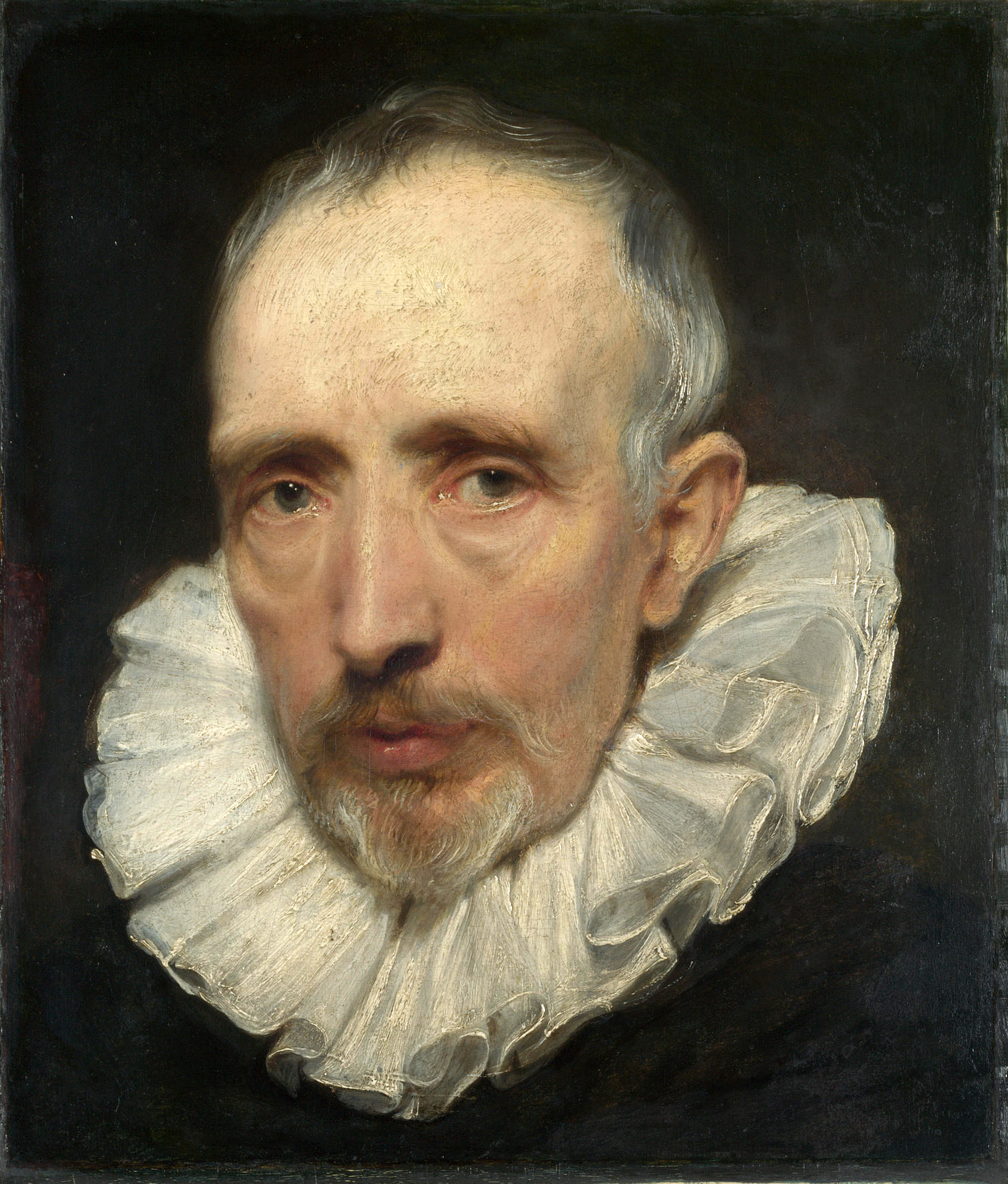
Portrait of Cornelis van der Geest by Anthony van Dyck, before 1620, now in the National Gallery

Cornelis van der Geest (1555 – 10 March 1638) was a spice merchant from Antwerp who used his wealth to support the Antwerp artists and to establish his art collection. He was also the dean of the haberdashers' guild.

== Art collection ==
He is known today for his art collection. He was portrayed repeatedly by Anthony van Dyck, including in the 1620 Portrait of Cornelis van der Geest.

Willem van Haecht, whom van der Geest employed as a curator of his collection, painted van der Geest's collection several times, including in a painting showing the visit of the governors of the Spanish Netherlands, Albert VII, Archduke of Austria and Isabella Clara Eugenia to the collection (Rubenshuis, Antwerp). Van der Geest owned two paintings by the prominent Antwerp painter Quentin Matsys and/or his workshop, one of which, a Madonna, van der Geest is pointing to in the Rubenshuis painting. Other artworks included in this painting are Woman at her toilet by Jan van Eyck, a still life by Frans Snyders, Ceres Mocked by Adam Elsheimer, Danaë by Van Haecht, Battle of the Amazons and a portrait by Peter Paul Rubens, Pancake bakery by Pieter Aertsen, a drawing of Apelles painting Campaspe by Johannes Wierix and a hunting scene by Jan Wildens. The painting also shows some of Van der Geest's sculptures, with copies of the Venus de' Medici, the Farnese Hercules, and the Apollo Belvedere.

Van Heacht's paintings of the collection of Cornelis van der Geest

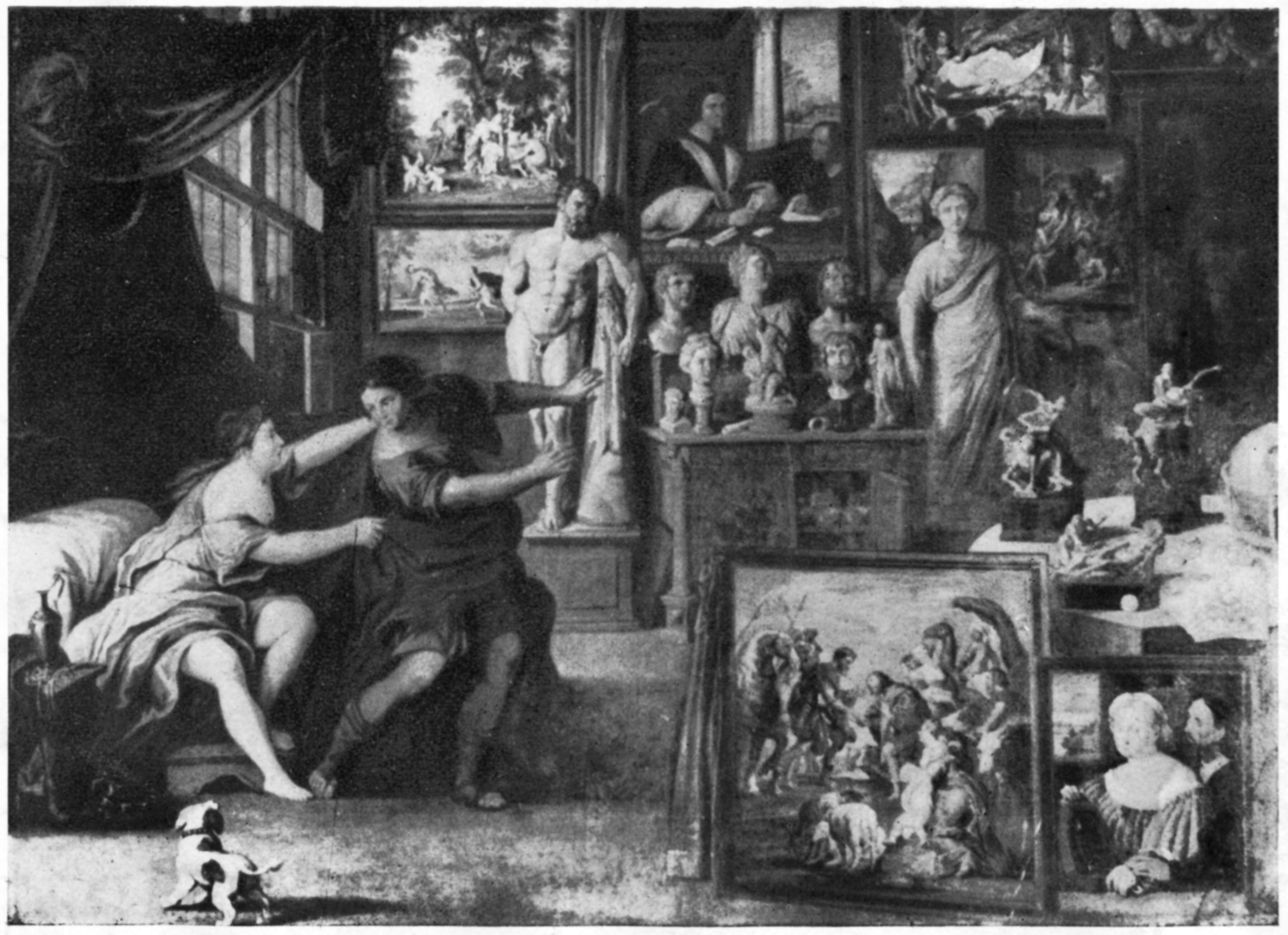
(1) Interior of an art collection with Joseph and Potiphar's wife, c. 1630, location unknown

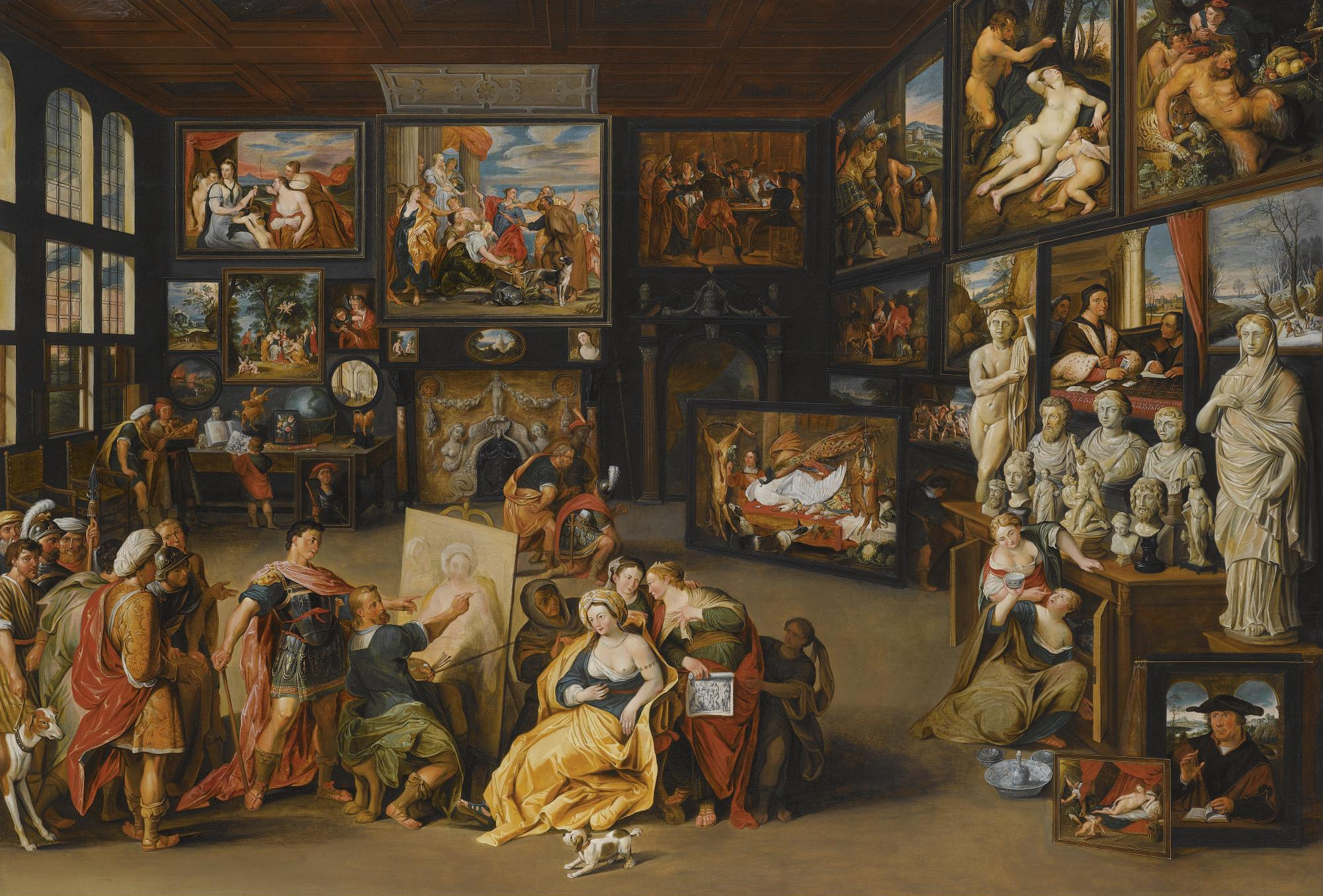
(2) Alexander the Great visits the studio of Apelles, c. 1630, private collection

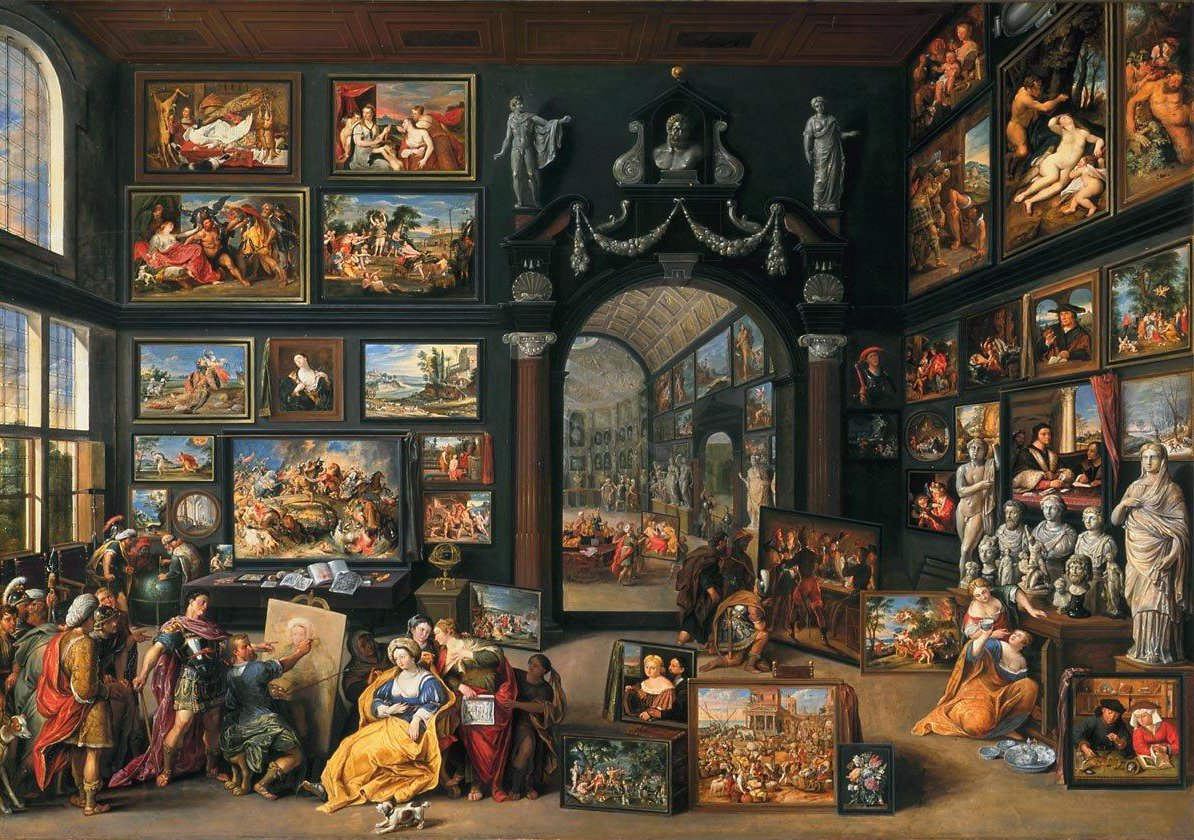
(3) Apelles painting Campaspe, c. 1630, Mauritshuis

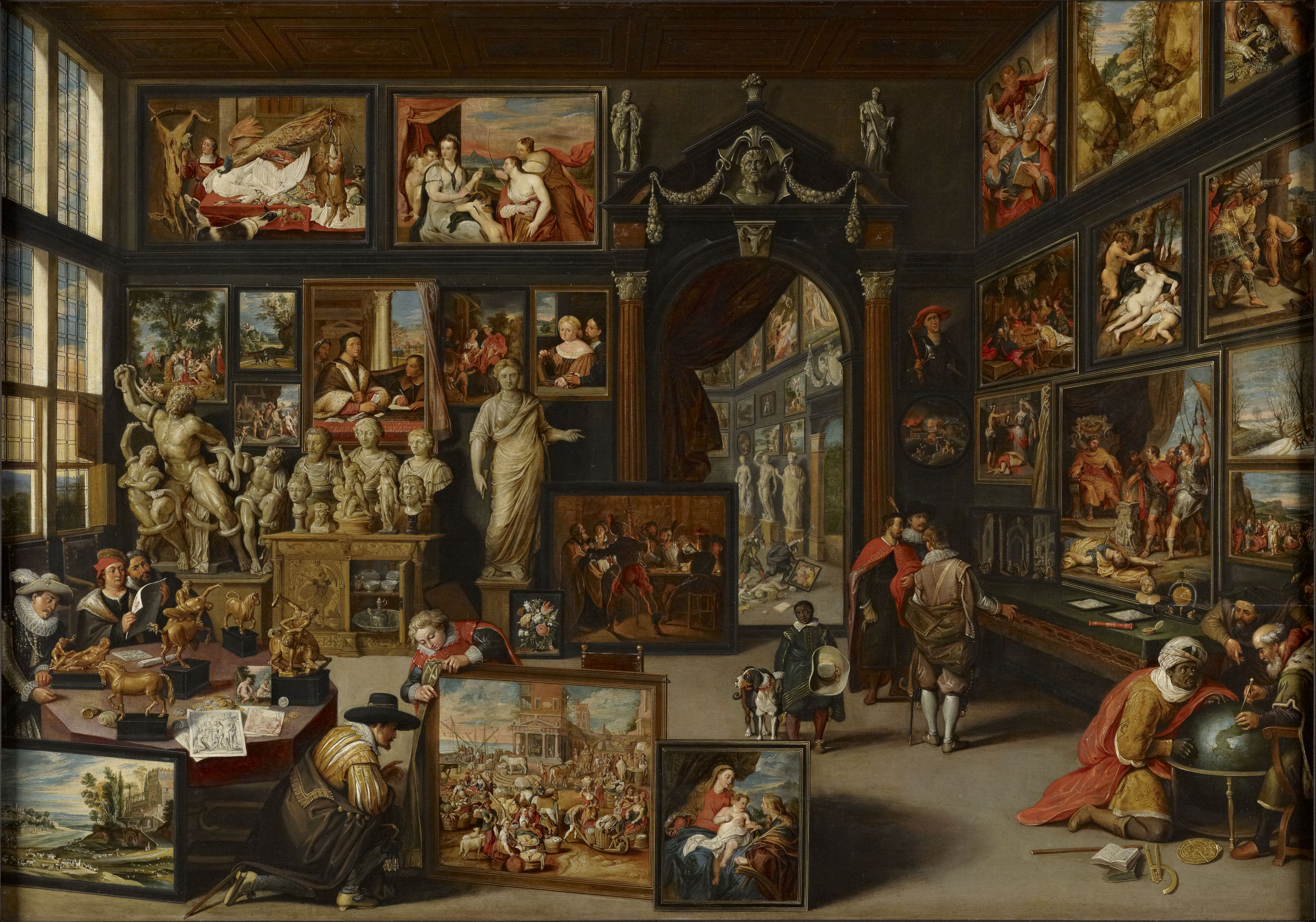
(4) Art Cabinet with Anthony van Dyck's 'Mystic Marriage of St Catherine', 1620-1637, Mount Stuart Trust

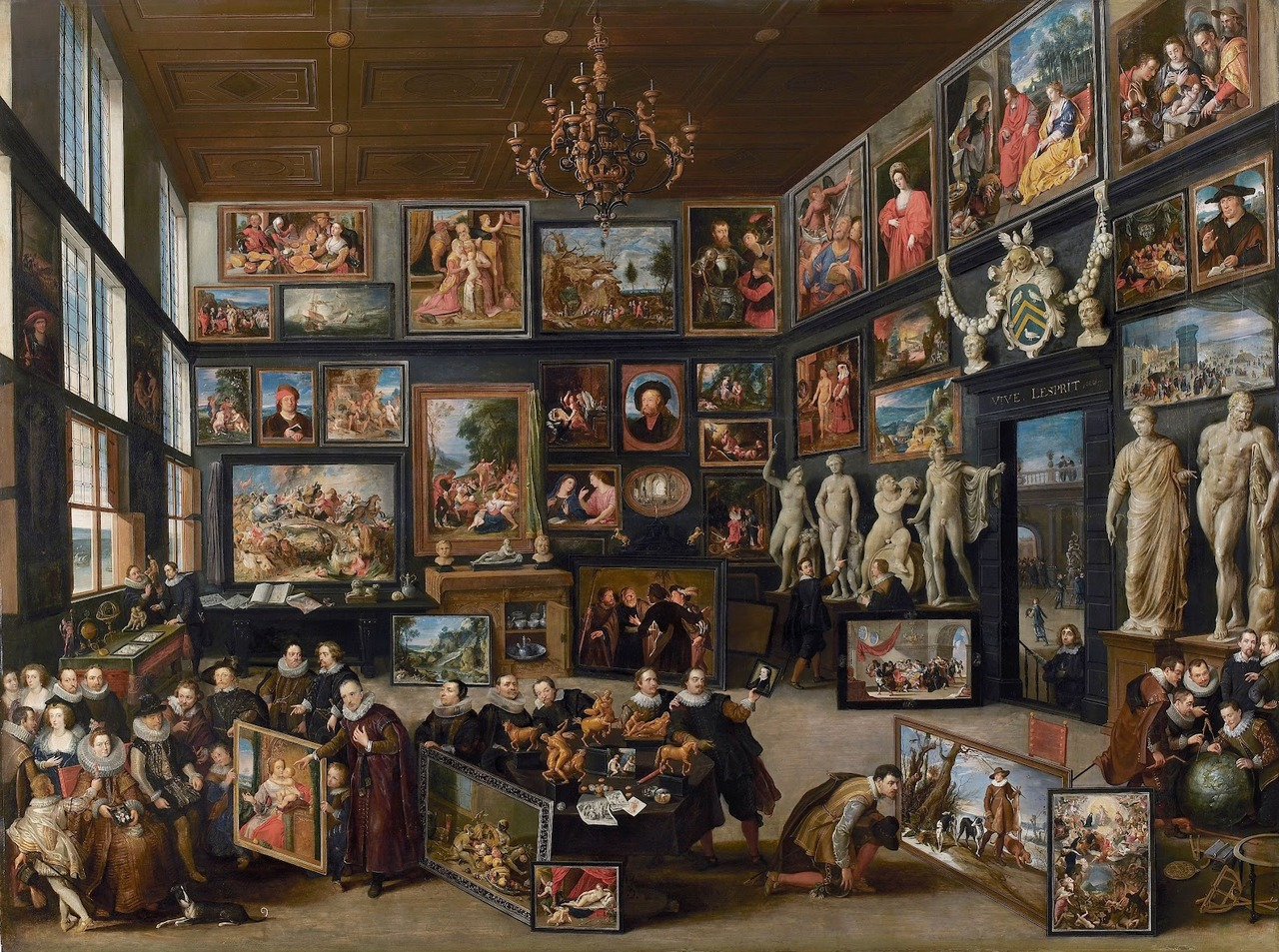
(5) Albert and Isabella visiting the Gallery of Cornelis van der Geest, 1628, Rubenshuis
Persons shown on the lower left of the picture in the Rubenshuis

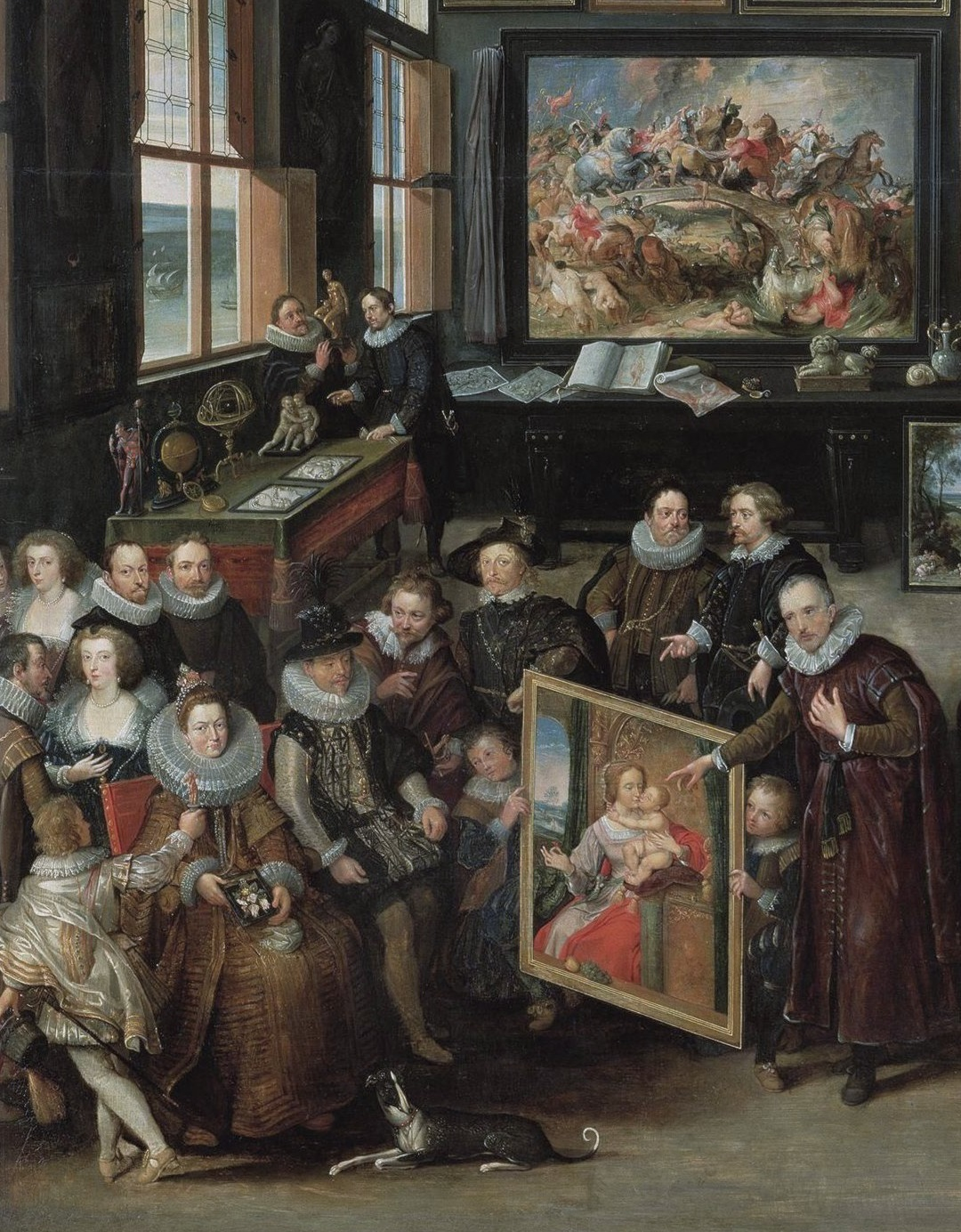
Isabella and Archduke Albert, Rubens, van Dyck, mint master Jan van Monfort, Prince Władysław Vasa of Poland (who visited van der Geest's Gallery in 1624, with black hat) and the host showing the Matsys Madonna
Paintings and drawings depicted in the five gallery paintings above followed by their numbers above

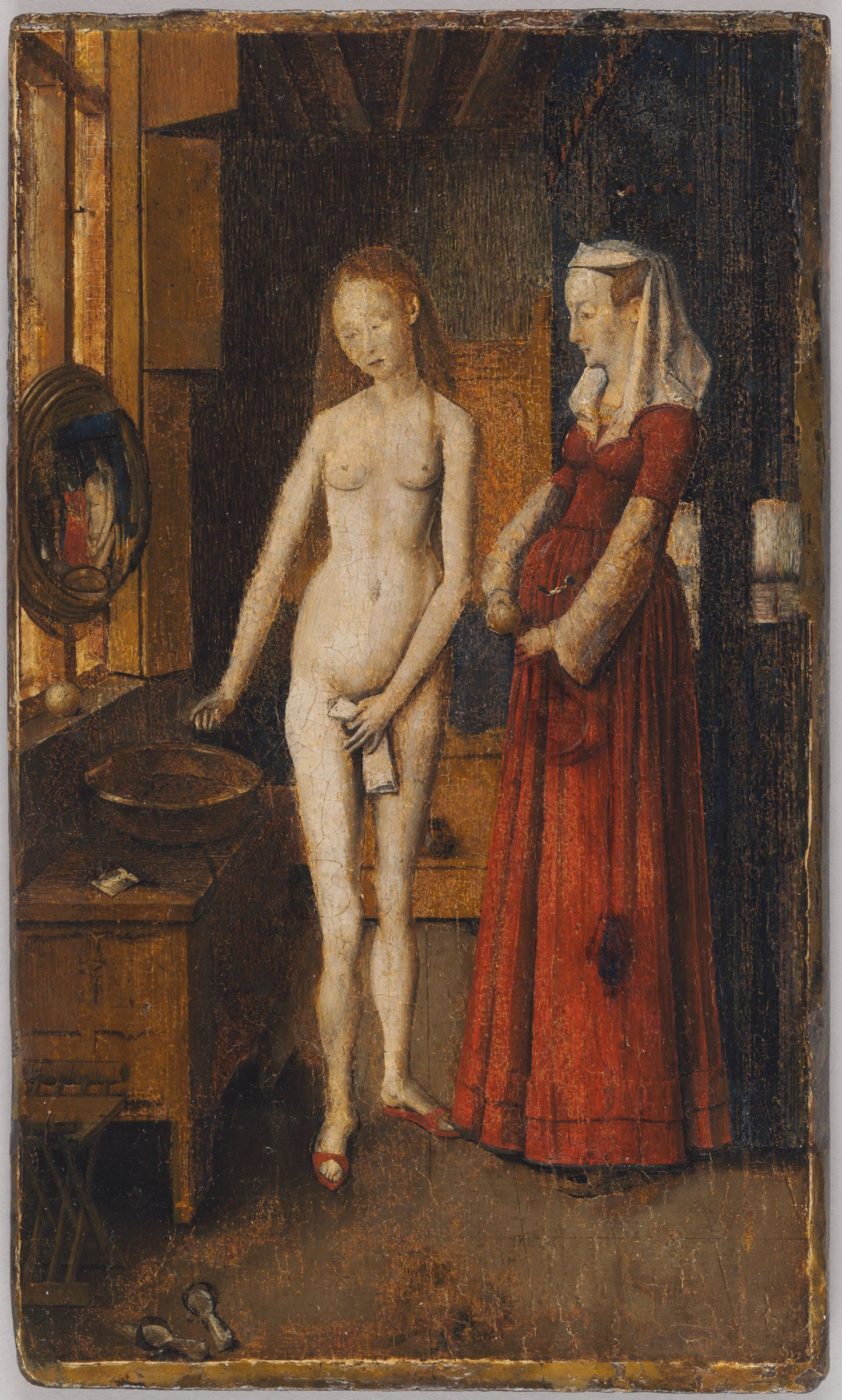
Woman at her Toilet copy after Jan van Eyck (5)

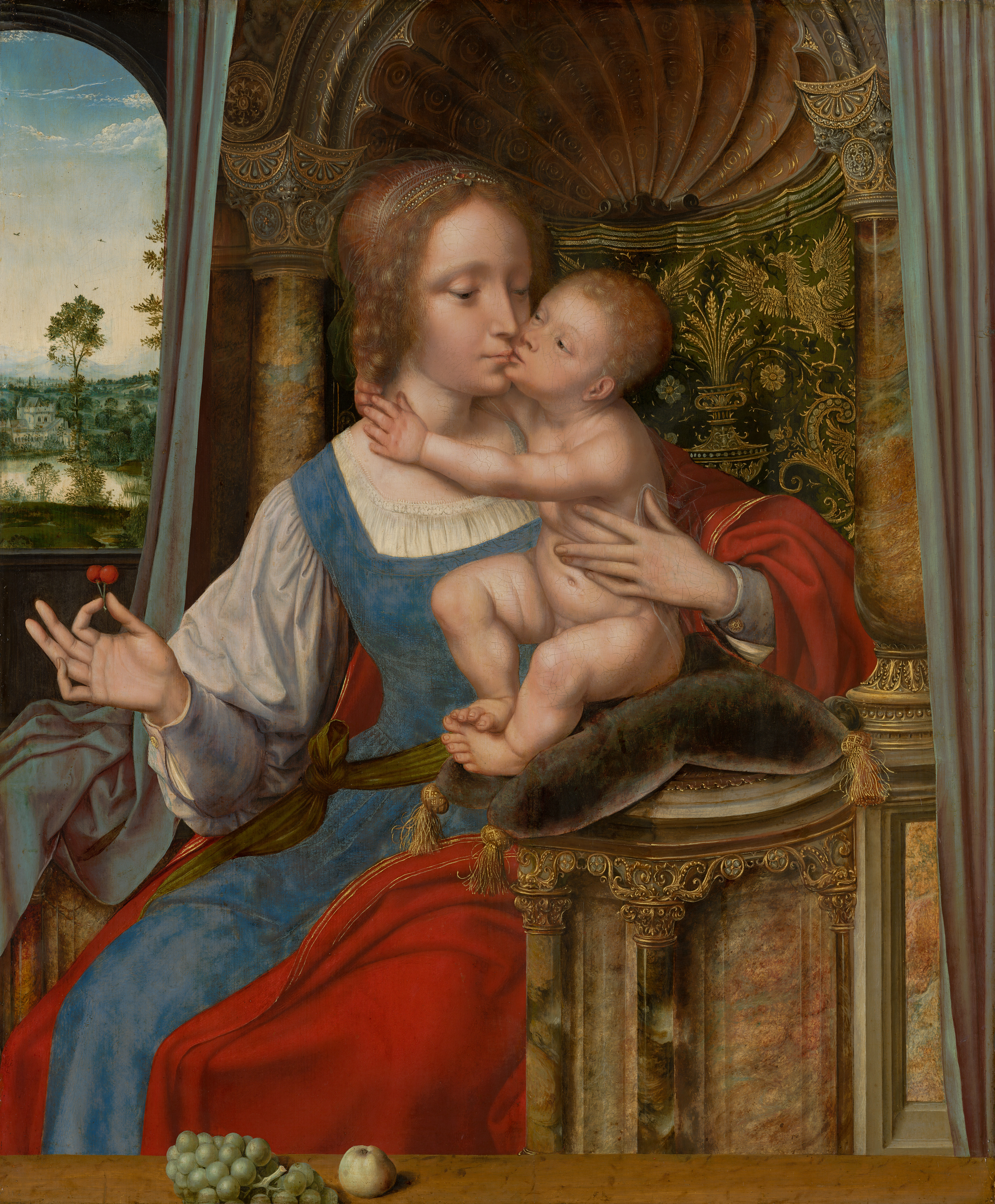
Madonna and Child Kissing by Quentin Matsys (and/or workshop) (5)

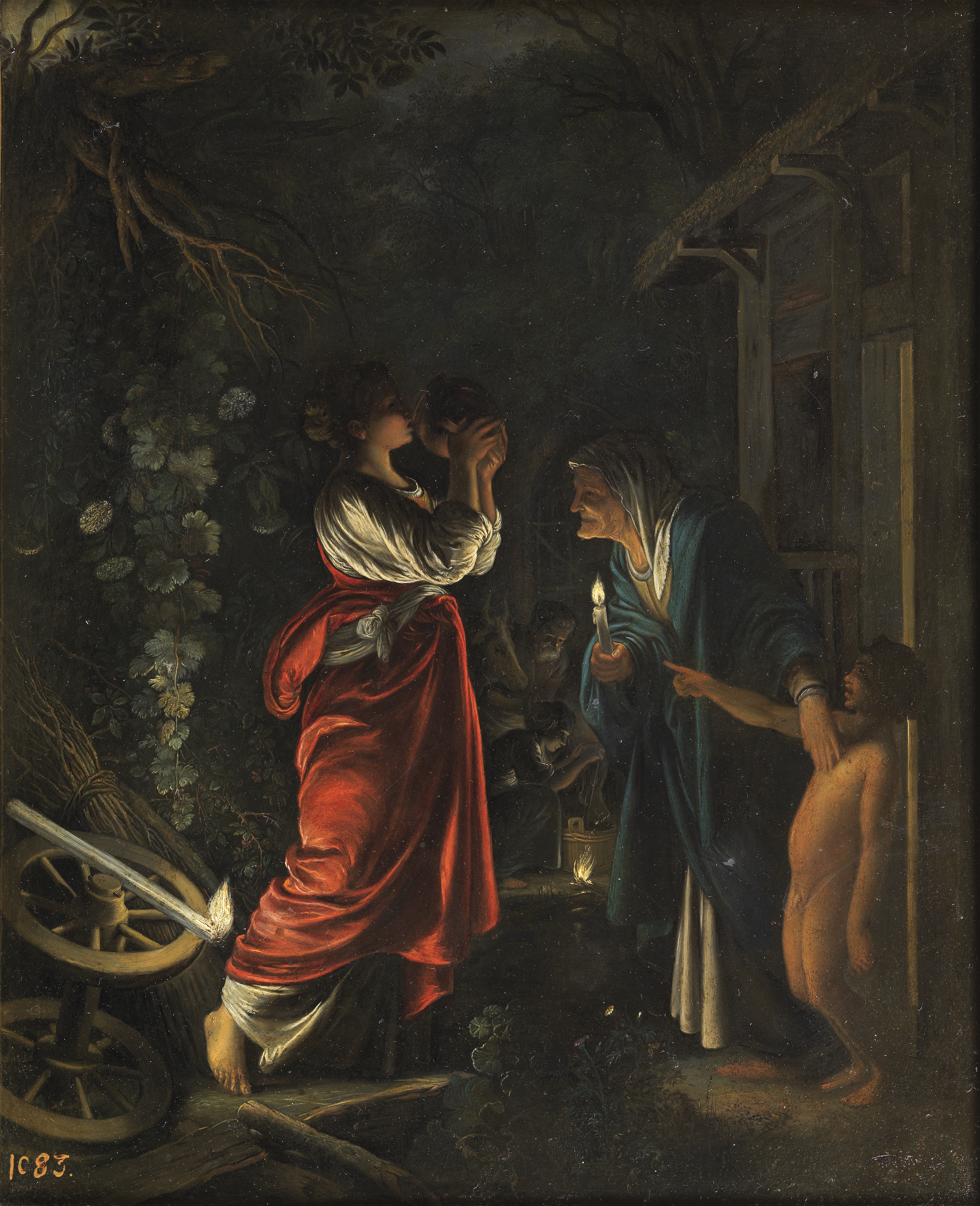
Ceres Mocked, by Adam Elsheimer and workshop (5)

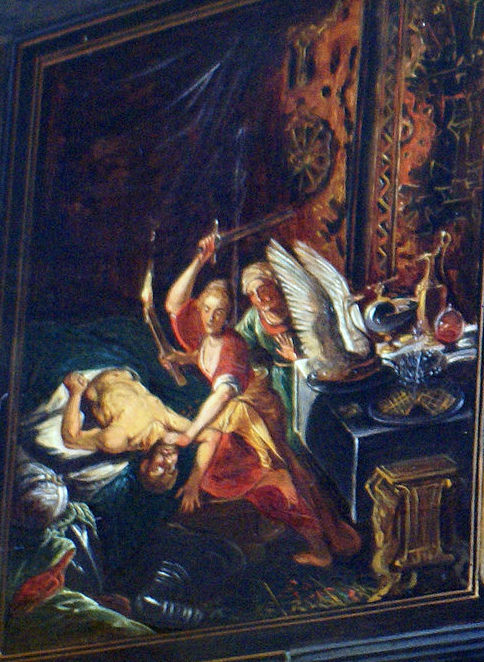
Judith and Holofernes, by Adam Elsheimer (3 & 5)

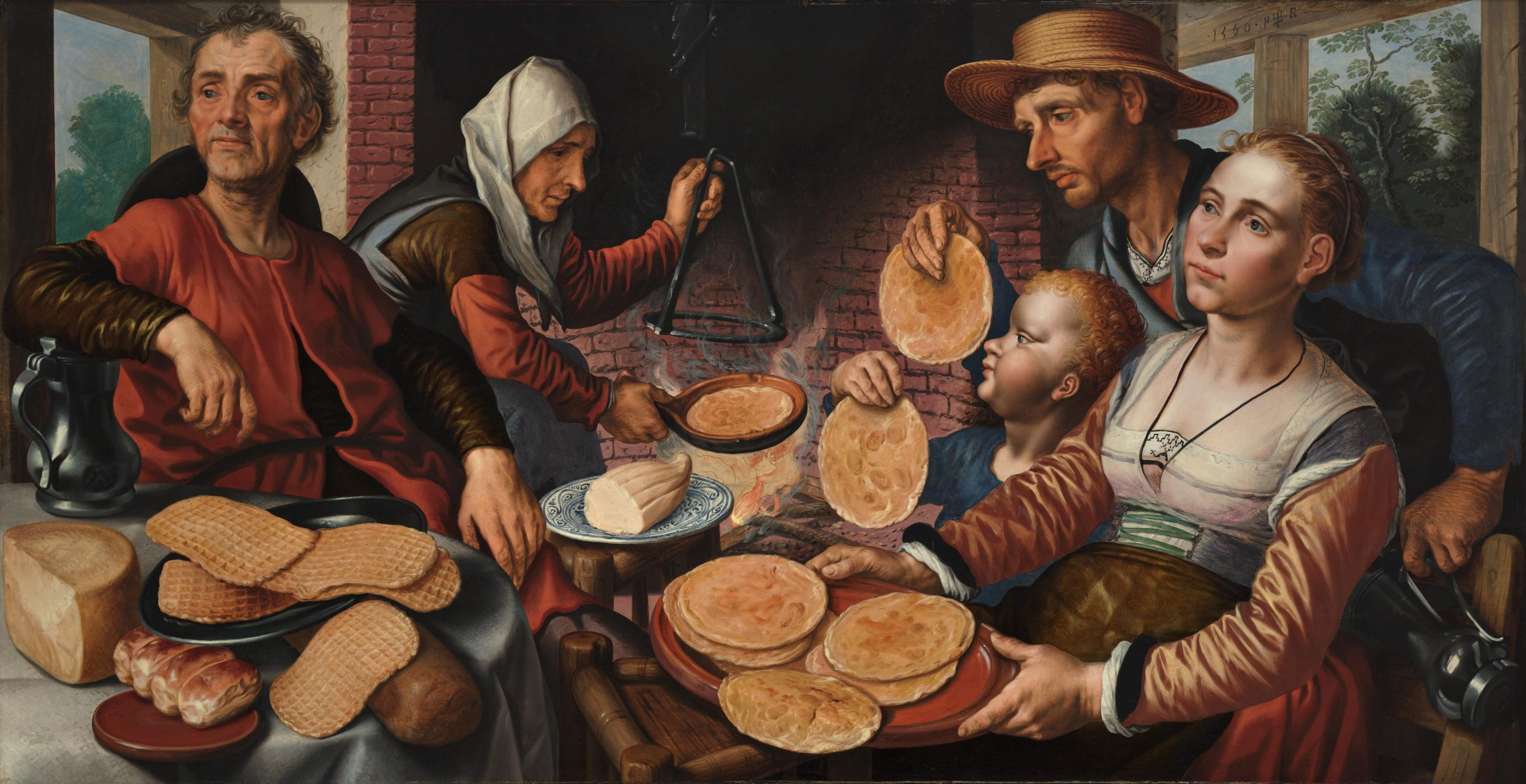
The Pancake Bakery, by Pieter Aertsen (5)

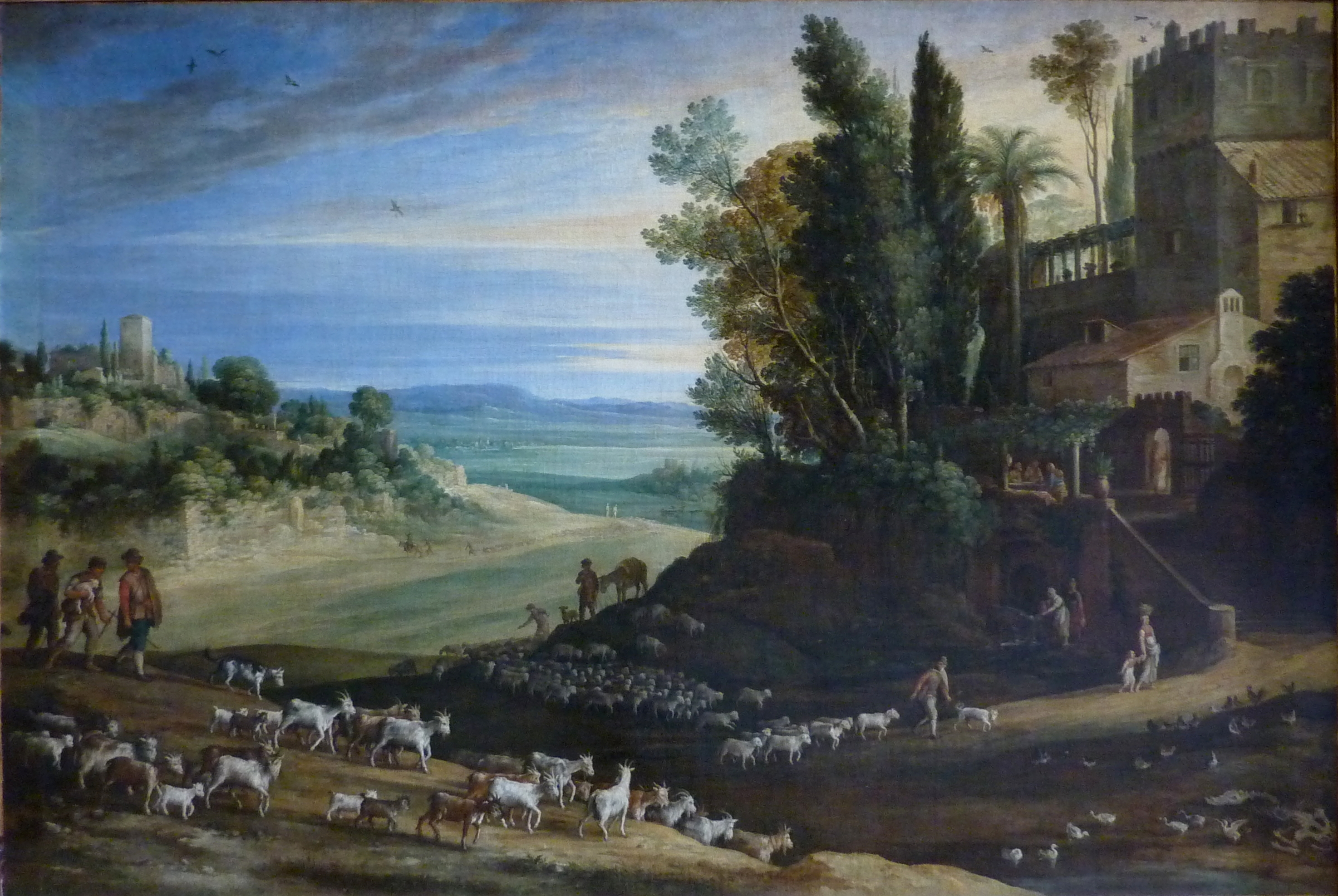
Pilgrims at Emmaus by Paul Bril (4)

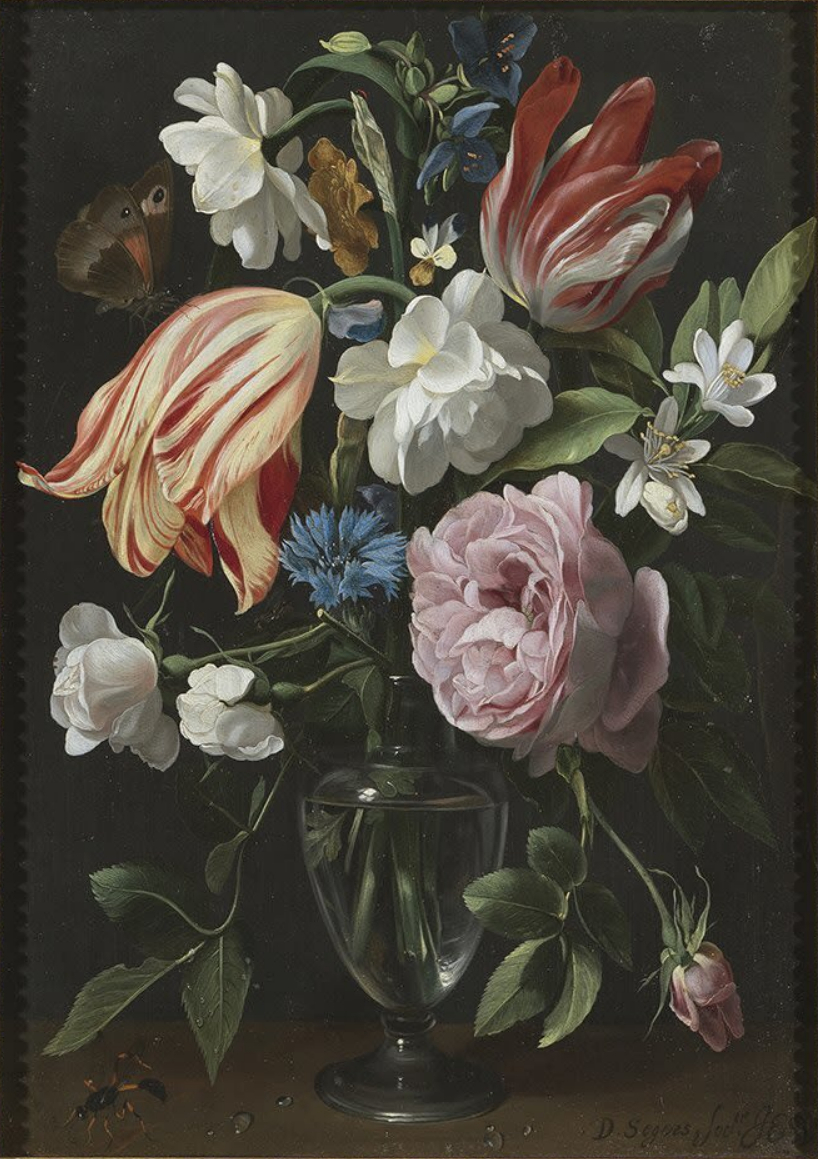
Flowers in a Vase, by Daniel Seghers (2,3 & 4)

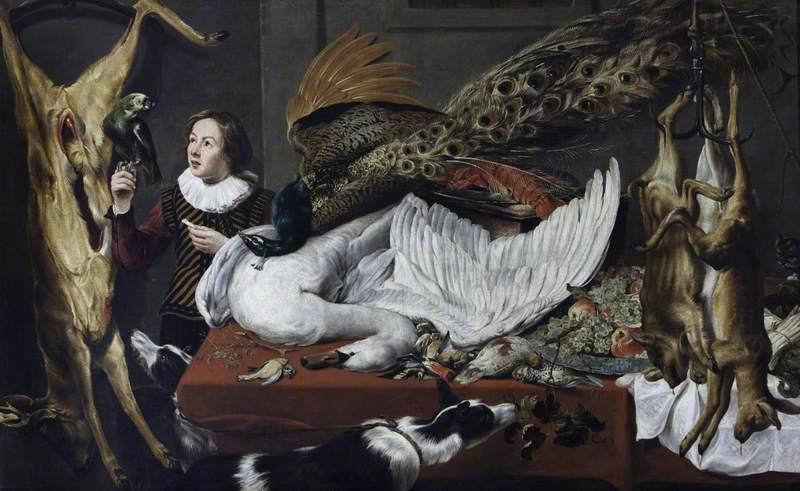
Game Larder Still Life with a Page Holding a Parrot, by Frans Snyders (1,2,3 & 5)

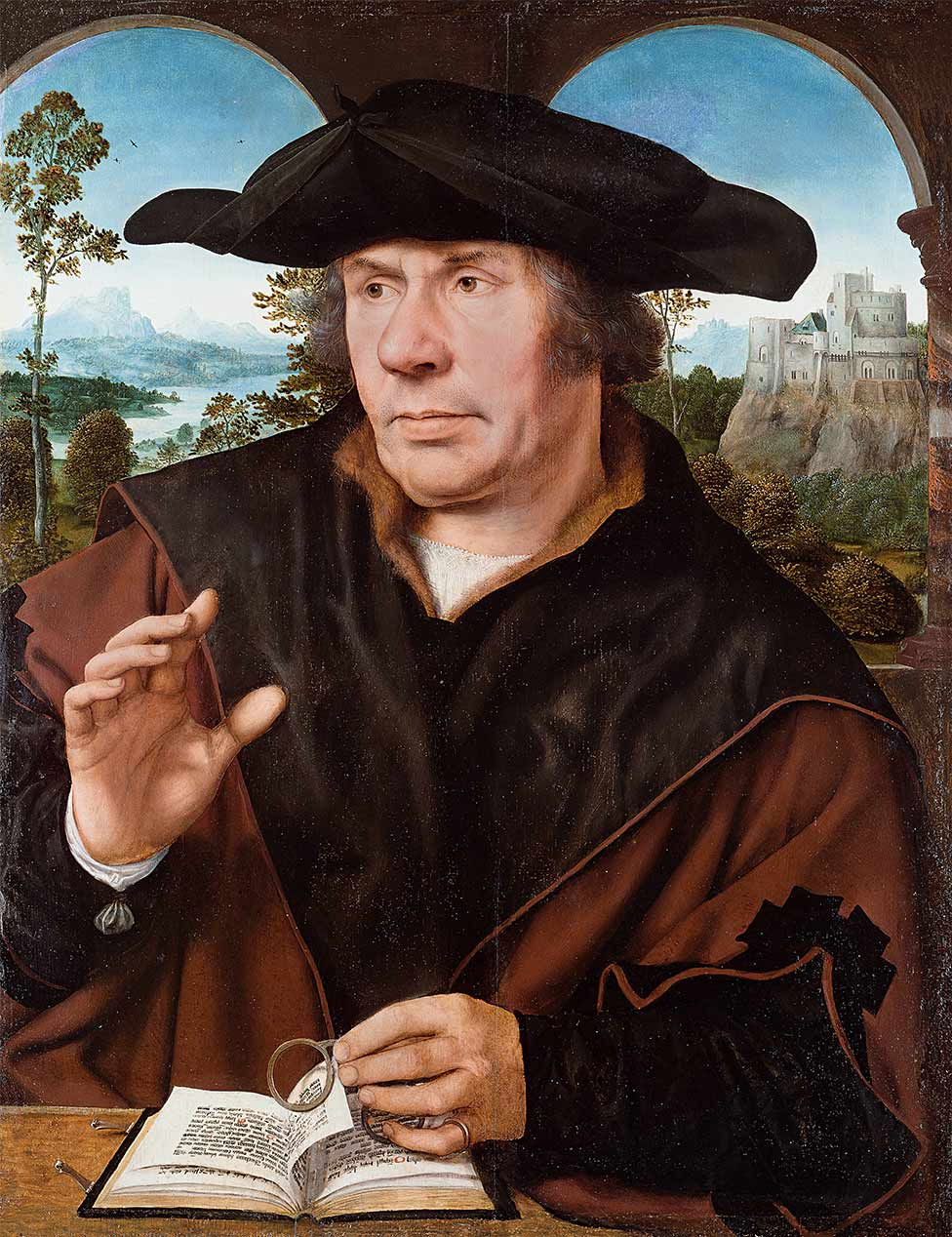
Portrait of a Scholar, by Quentin Matsys (2,3 & 5)

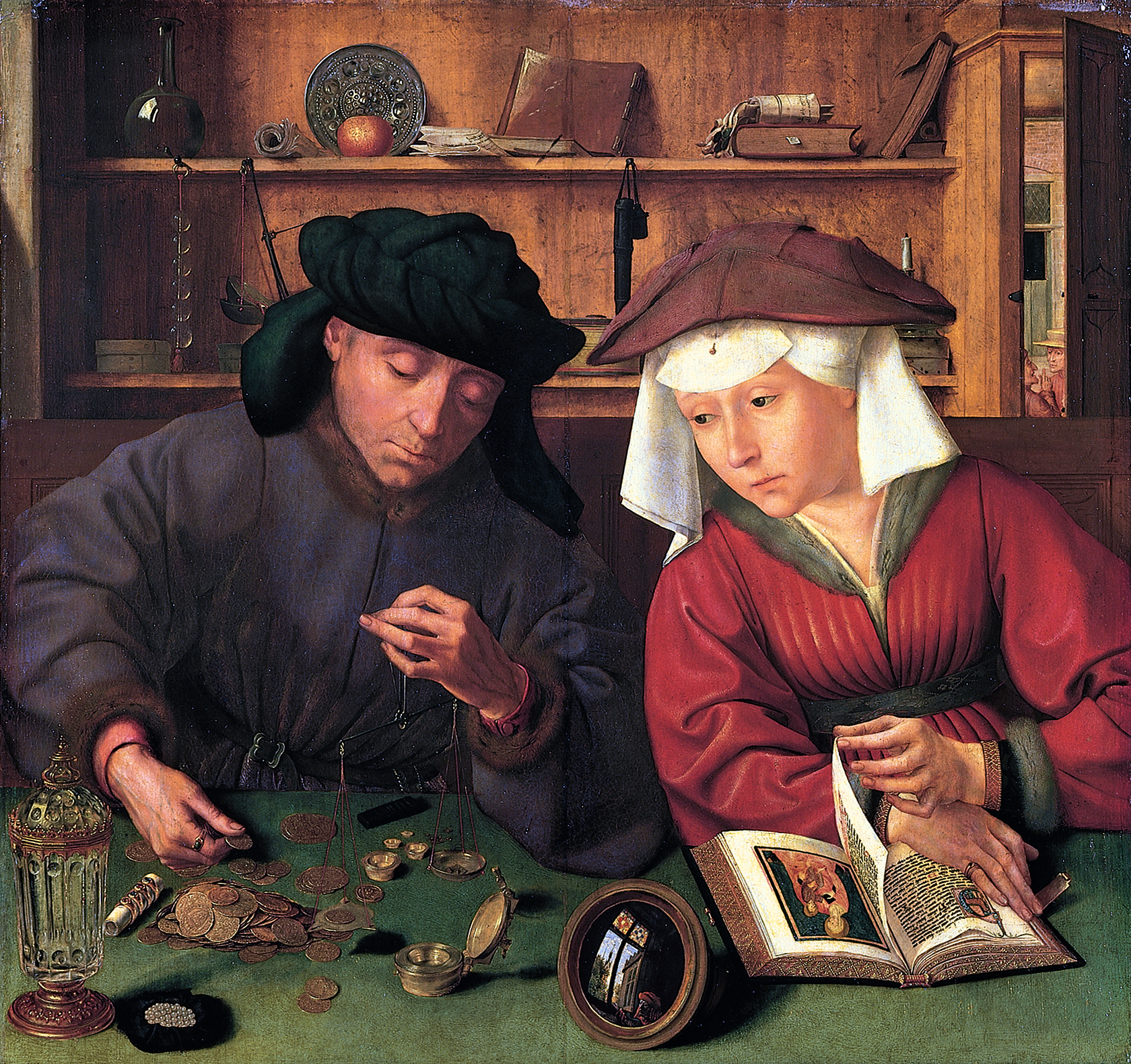
The Money Changer and His Wife, by Quentin Matsys (3)

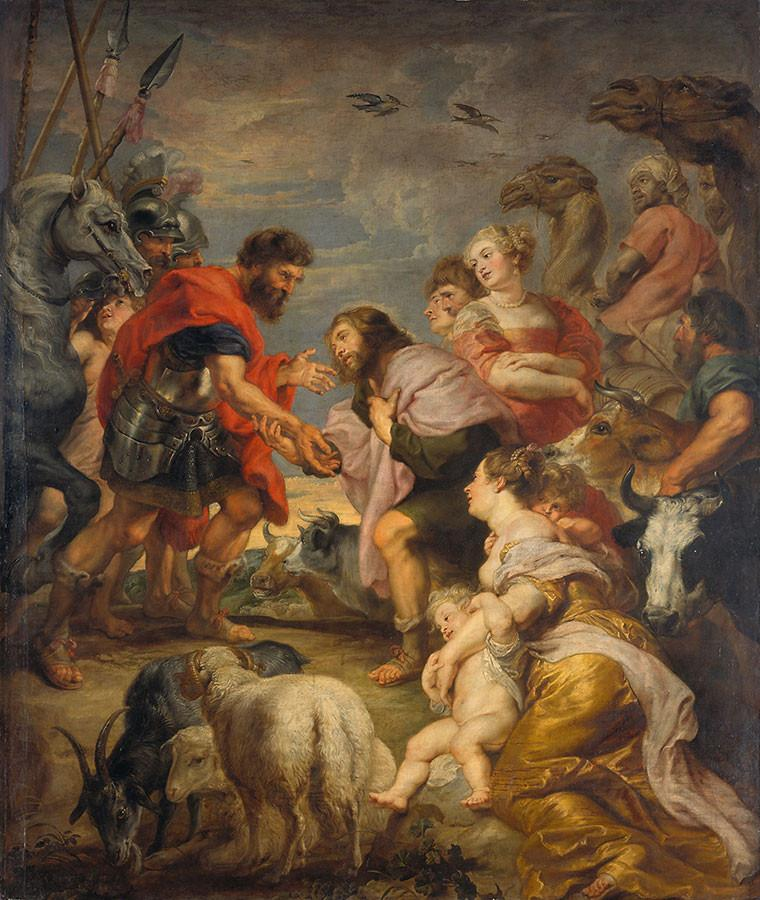
The Reconciliation of Esau and Jacob, by Rubens, (1)

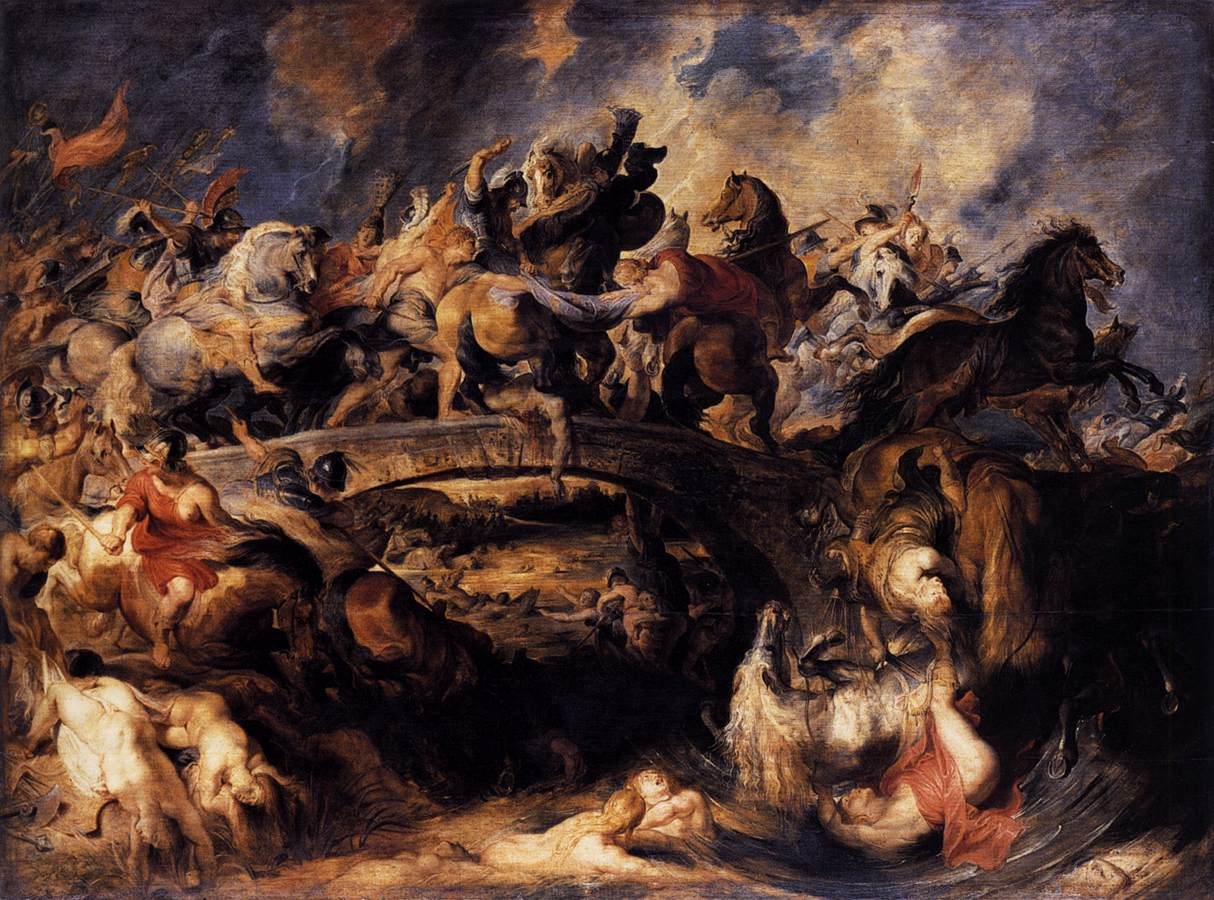
Battle of the Amazons by Rubens (3 & 5)

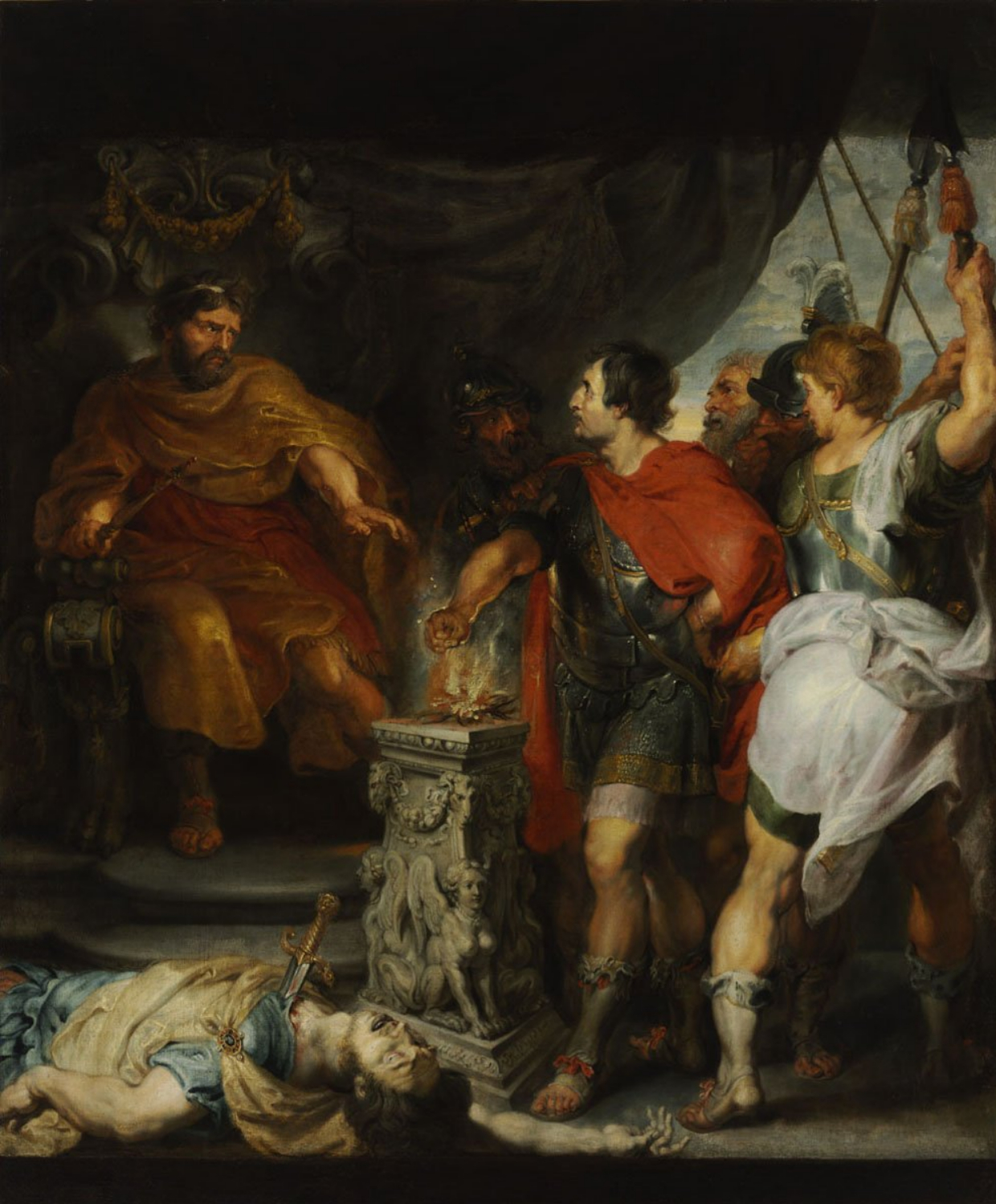
Mucius Scaevola before Porsenna, by Rubens (4)

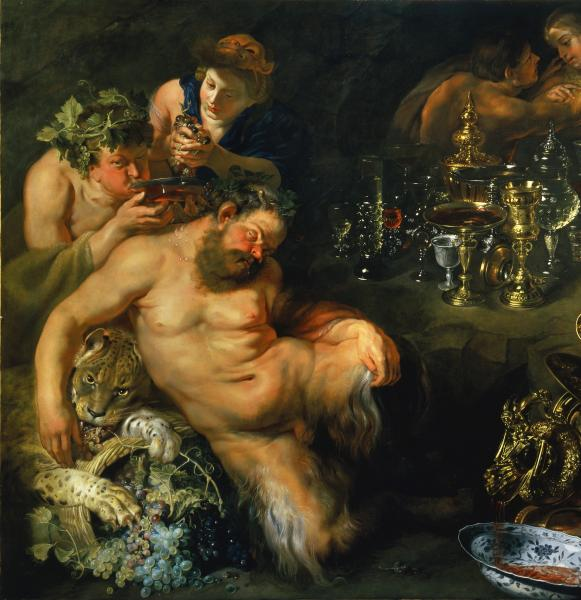
The Drunken Satyr, by Rubens (2,3 & 4)

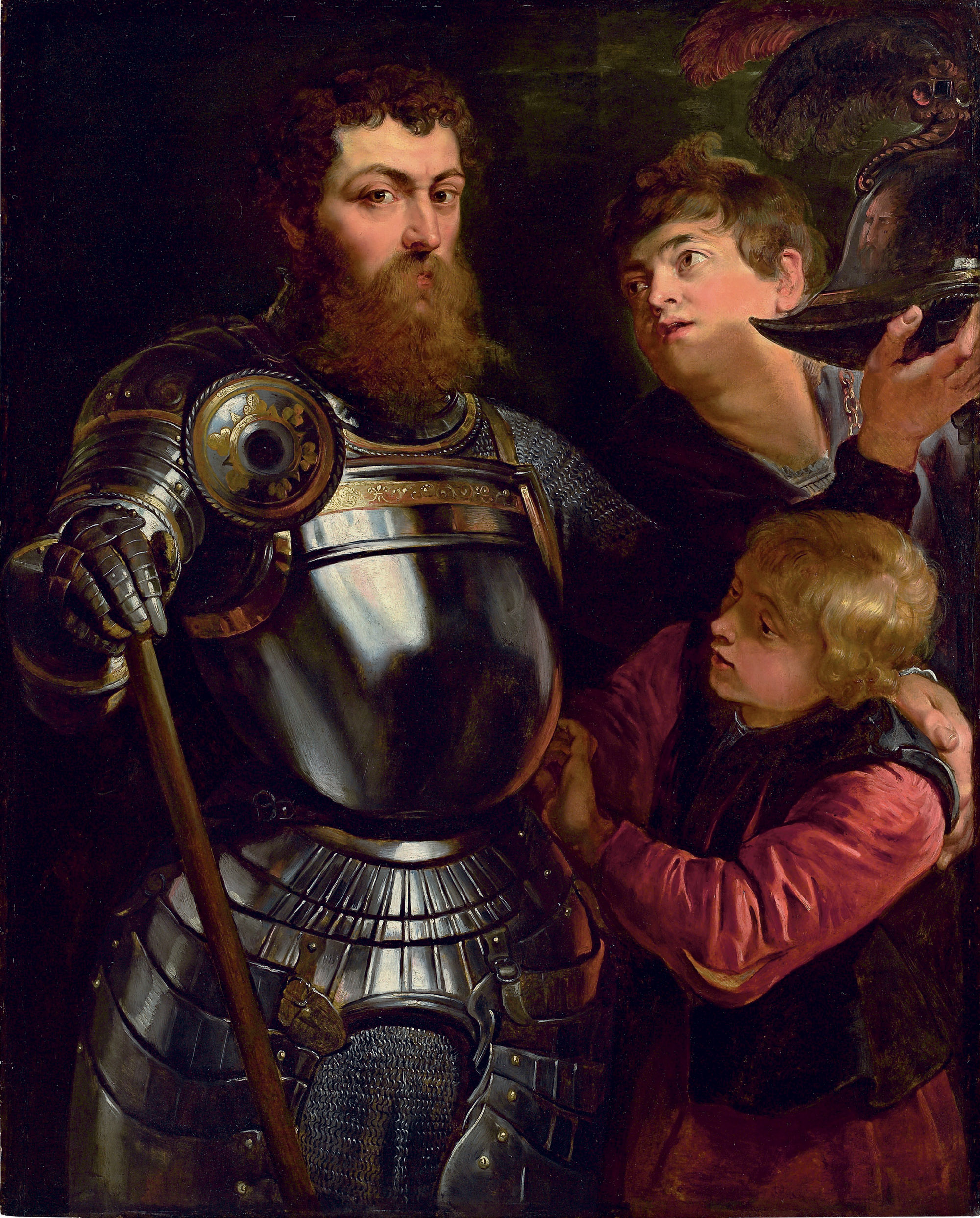
Portrait of a Commander, by Rubens (5)

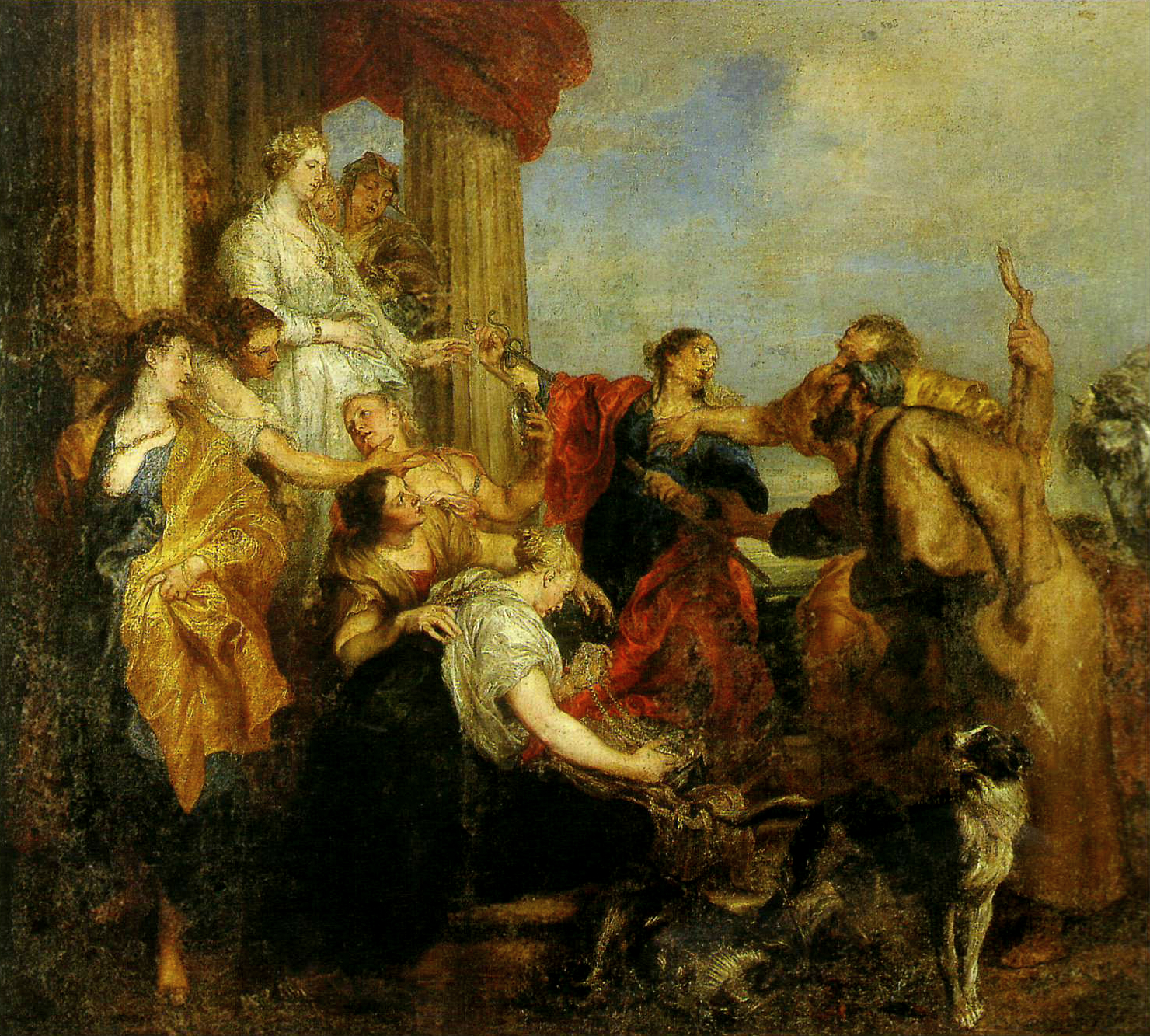
Achilles recognized among daughters of Lycomedes, by Anthony van Dyck (2)

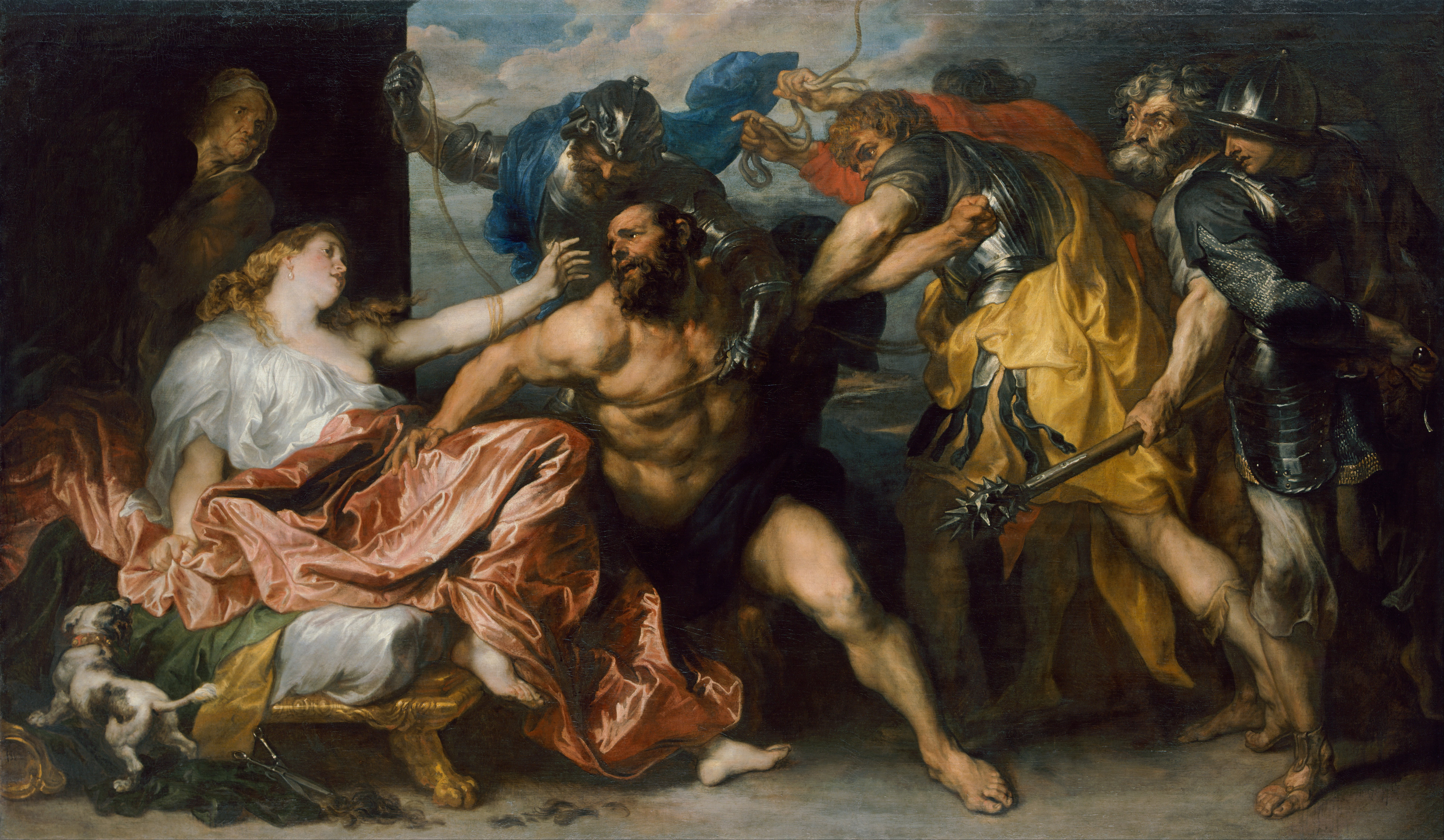
Samson and Delilah by Anthony van Dyck (3)

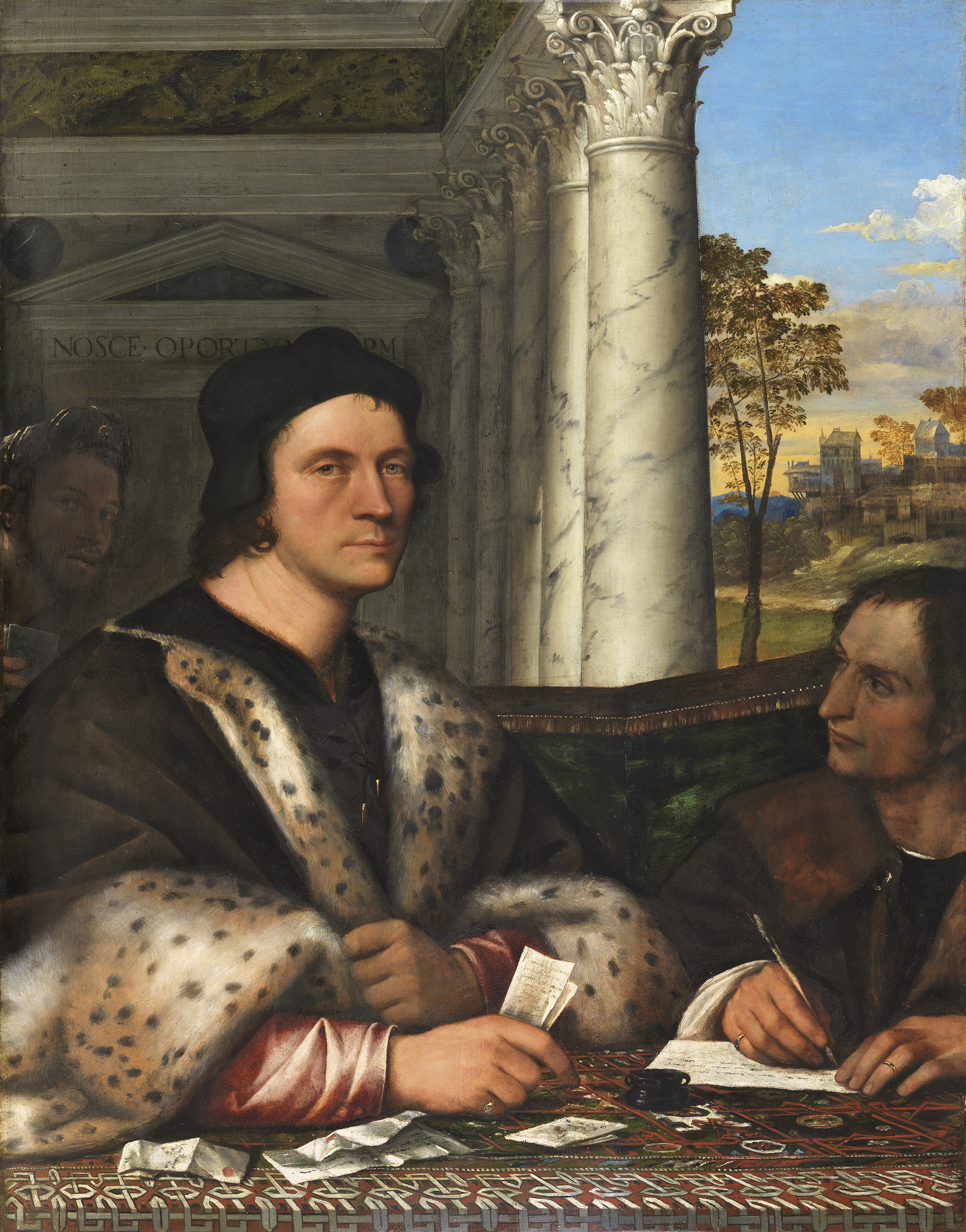
Portrait of Ferry Carondelet with his Secretaries, by Sebastiano del Piombo, (1,2,3 & 4)

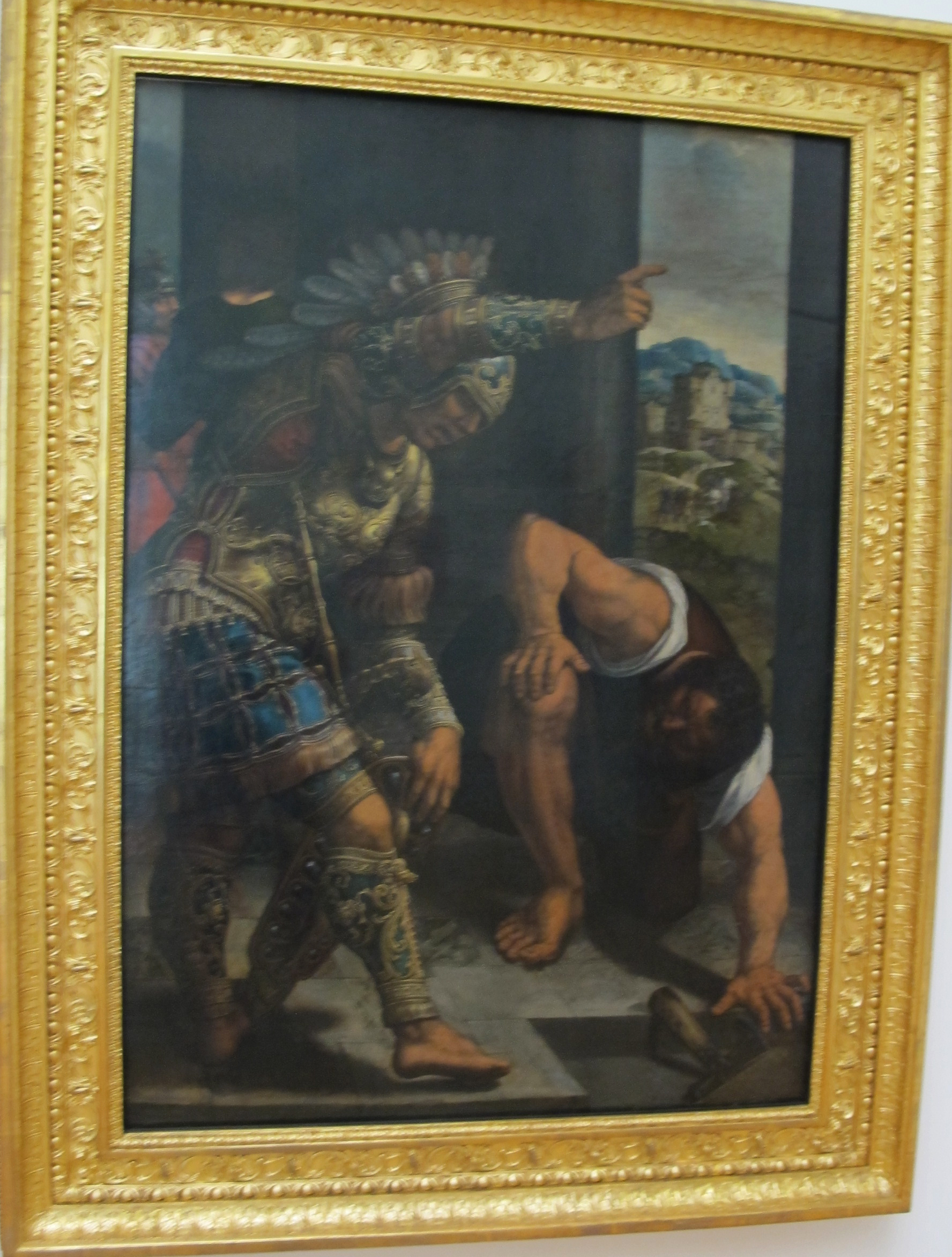
Roman Soldier and Servant, by Bernaert van Orley, (2,3 & 4)

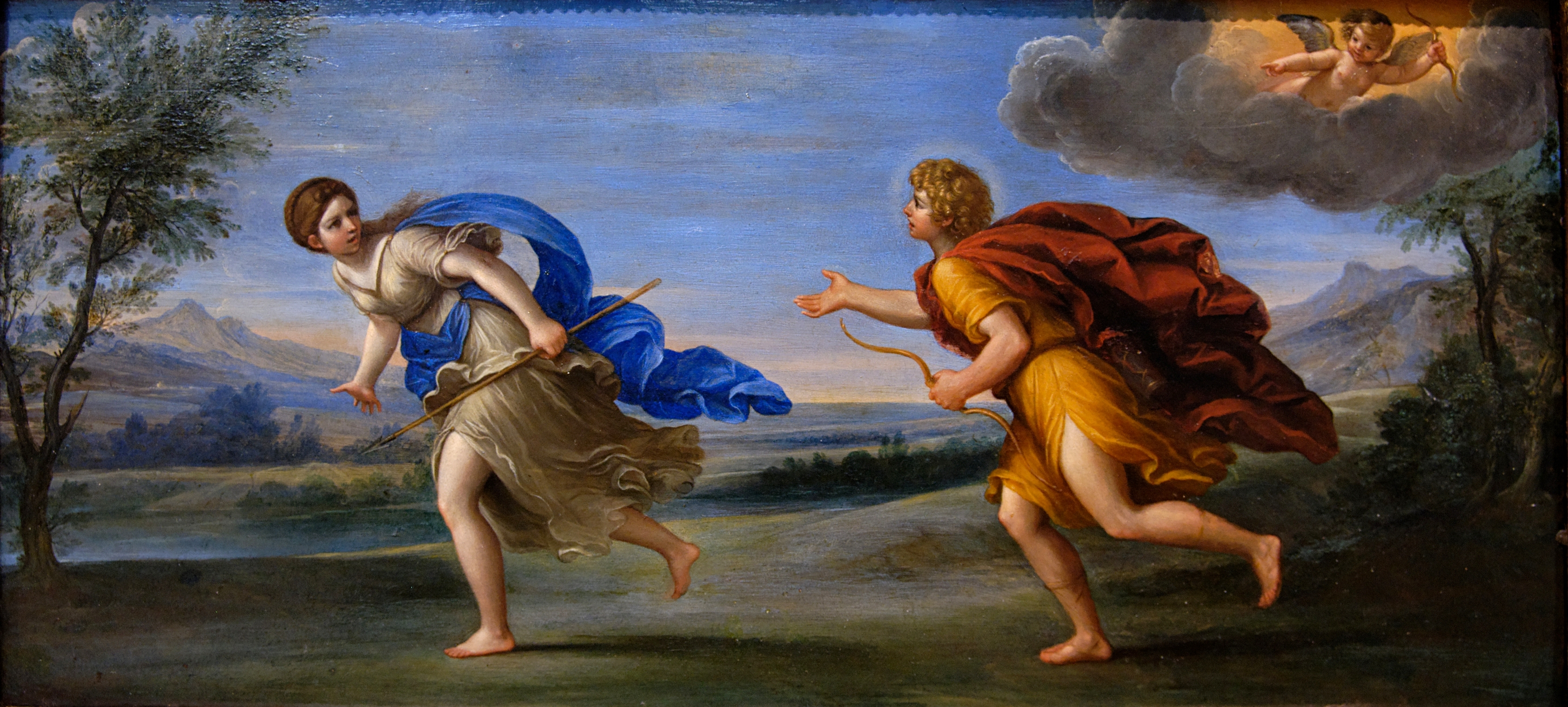
Apollo and Daphne, by Francesco Albani, (1 & 3)

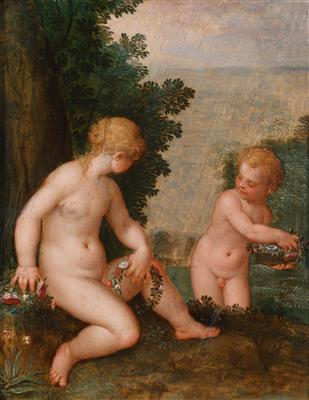
Spring, by Hans Rottenhammer, (2,3,4 & 5)

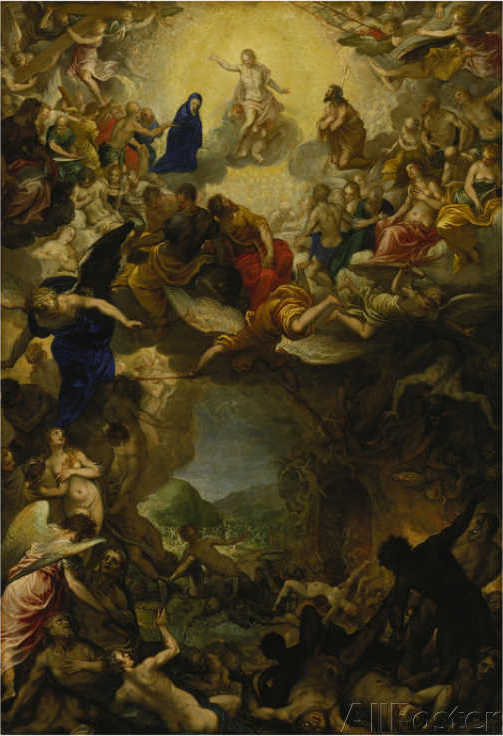
Last Judgement, by Hans Rottenhammer, (5)

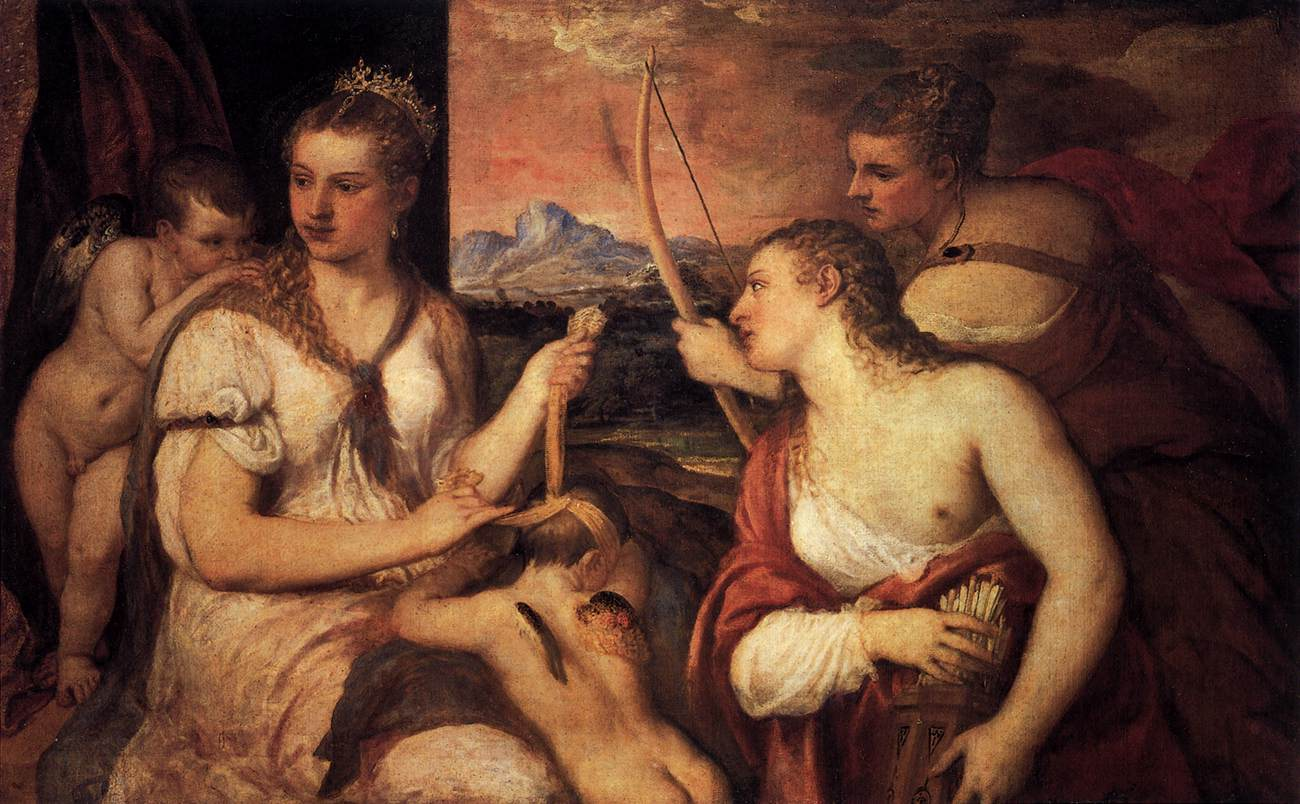
Venus Blindfolding Cupid, by Titian (2,3 & 4)

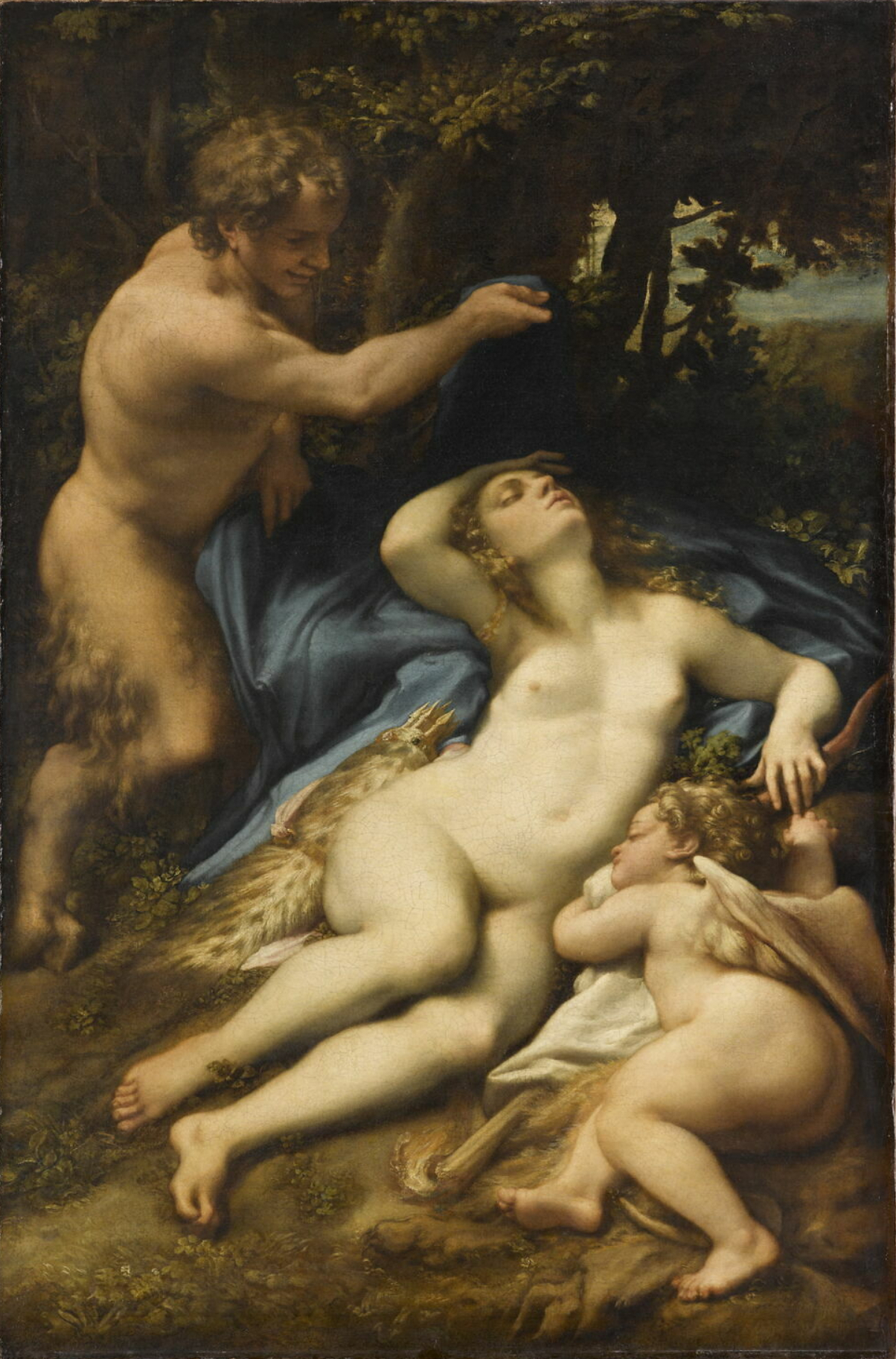
Venus and Cupid with a Satyr, by Correggio (2,3 & 4)

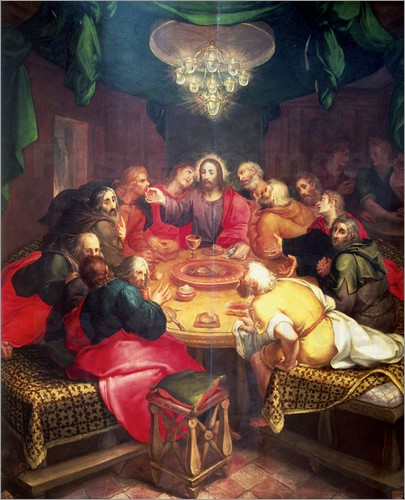
The Last Supper, by Otto van Veen, (4 & 5)

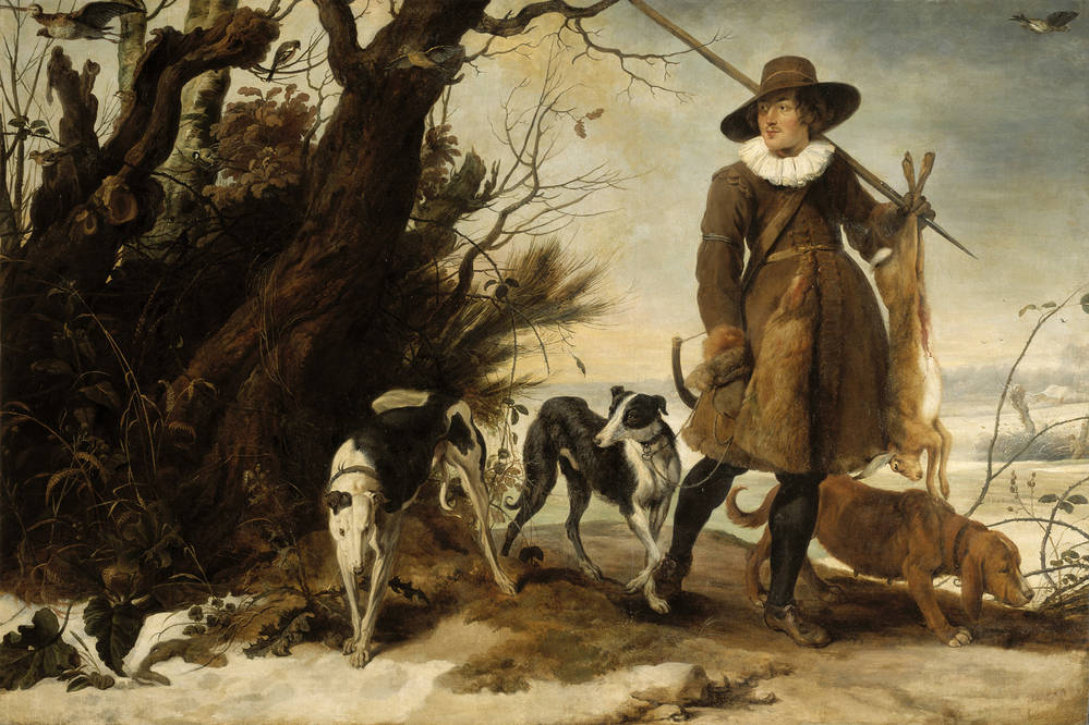
Winter Landscape, by Jan Wildens (5)

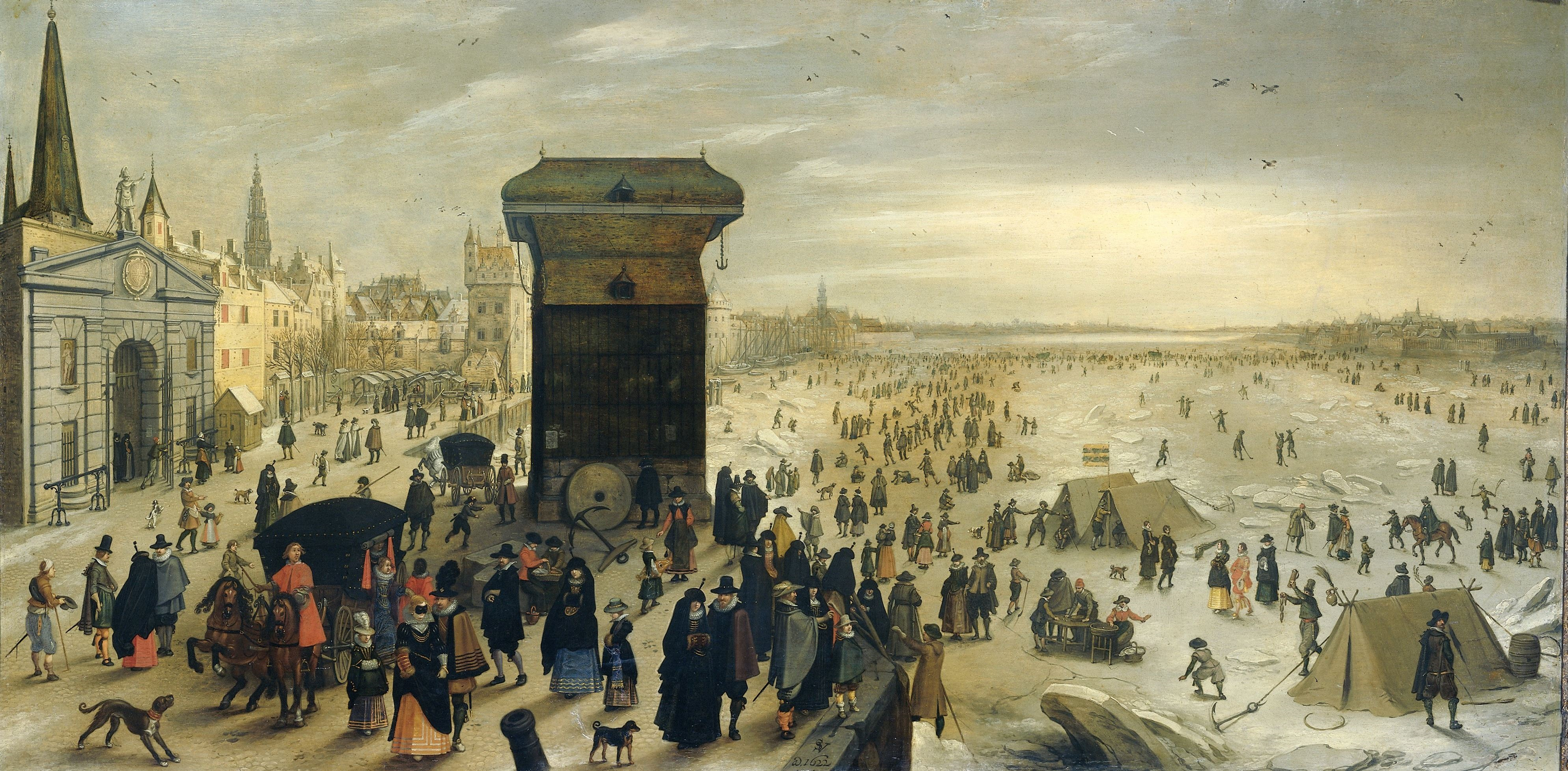
Kranenhoofd on the Schelde in Antwerp, by Sebastian Vrancx (5)

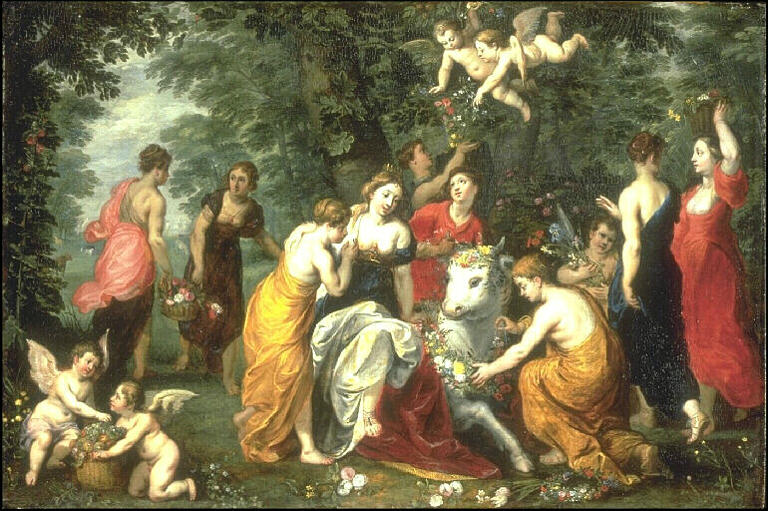
The Rape of Europa, by Hendrick van Balen (2 & 3)

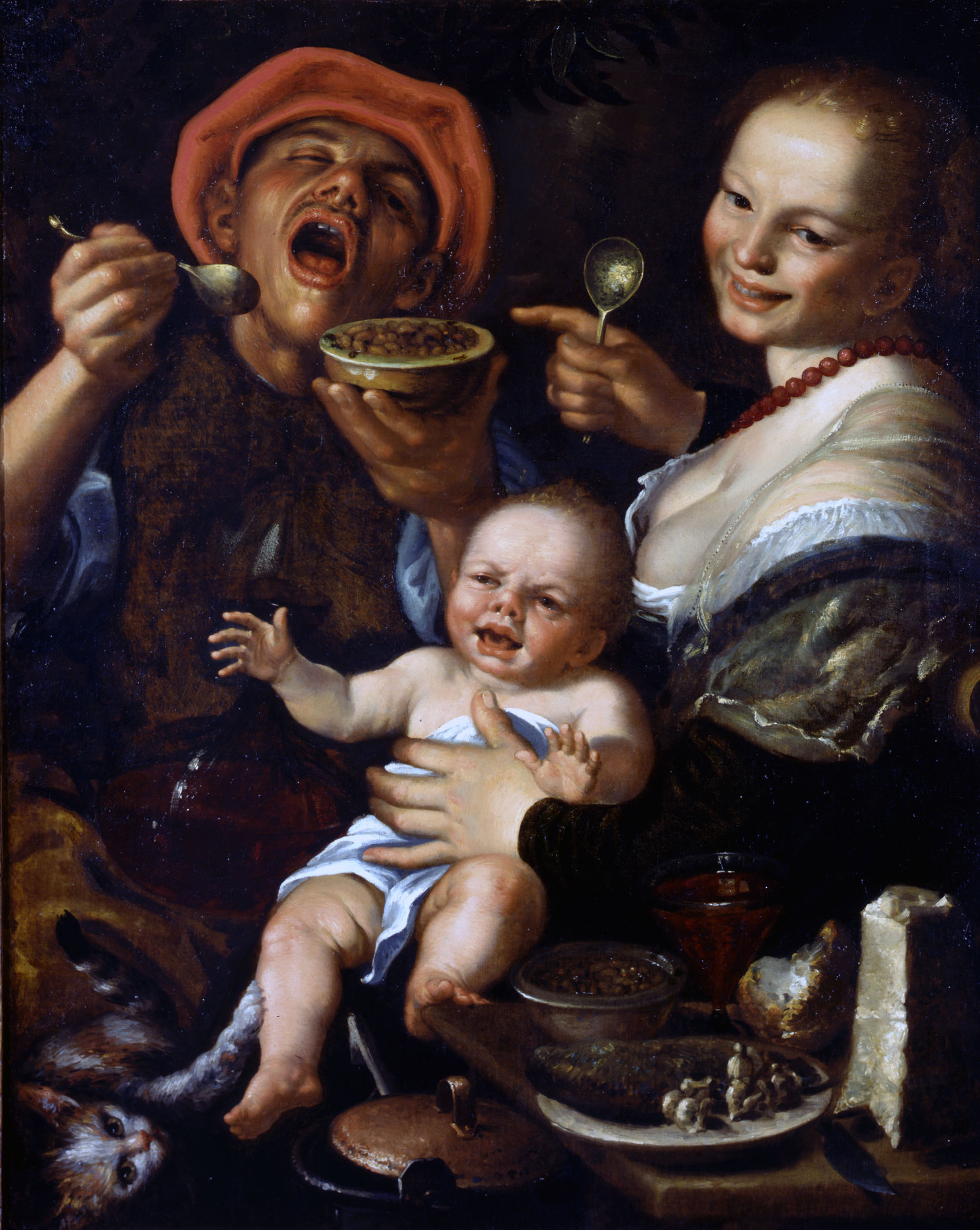
The Bean Eaters, by Vincenzo Campi (3)

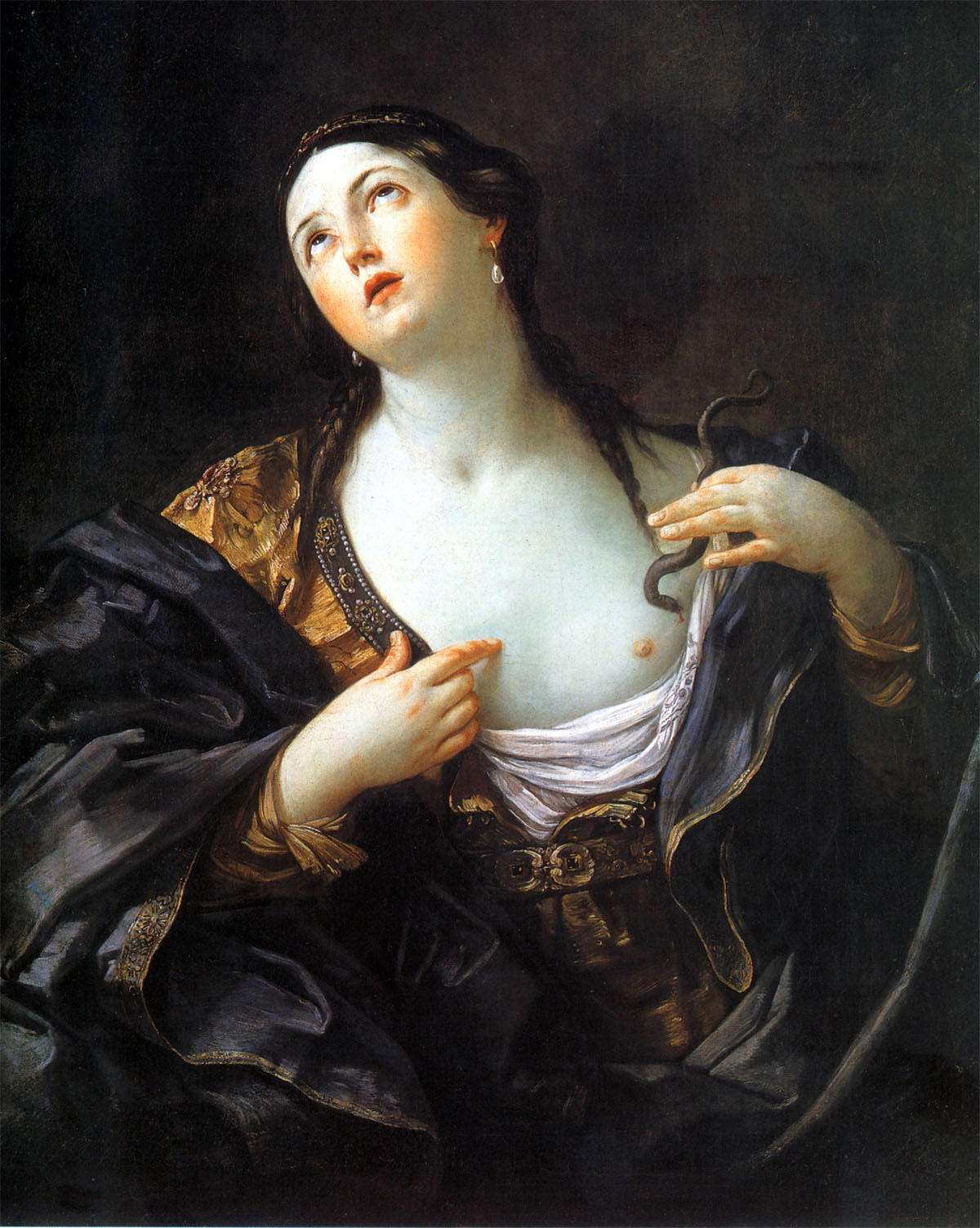
Death of Cleopatra, by Guido Reni (3)

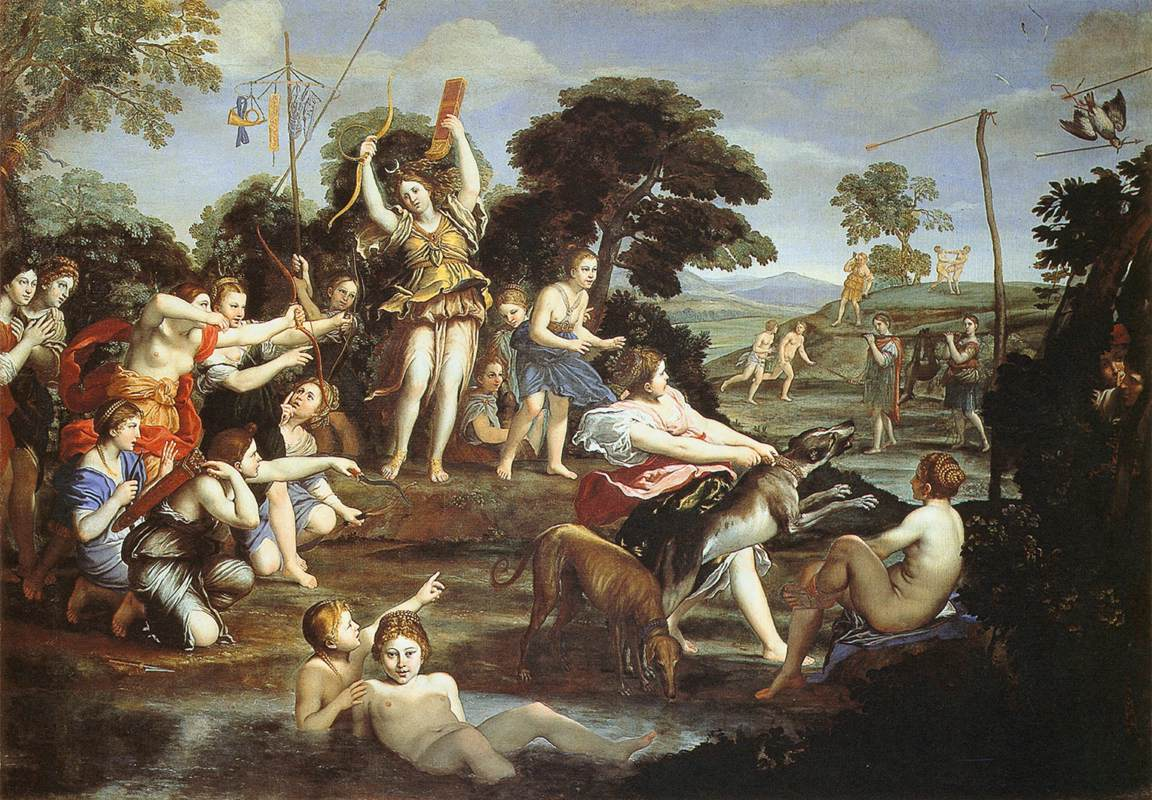
Diana and her Nymphs, by Domenichino (3)

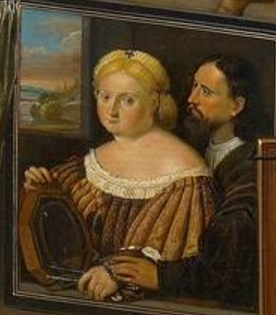
Couple with a Mirror, (1,3 & 4)

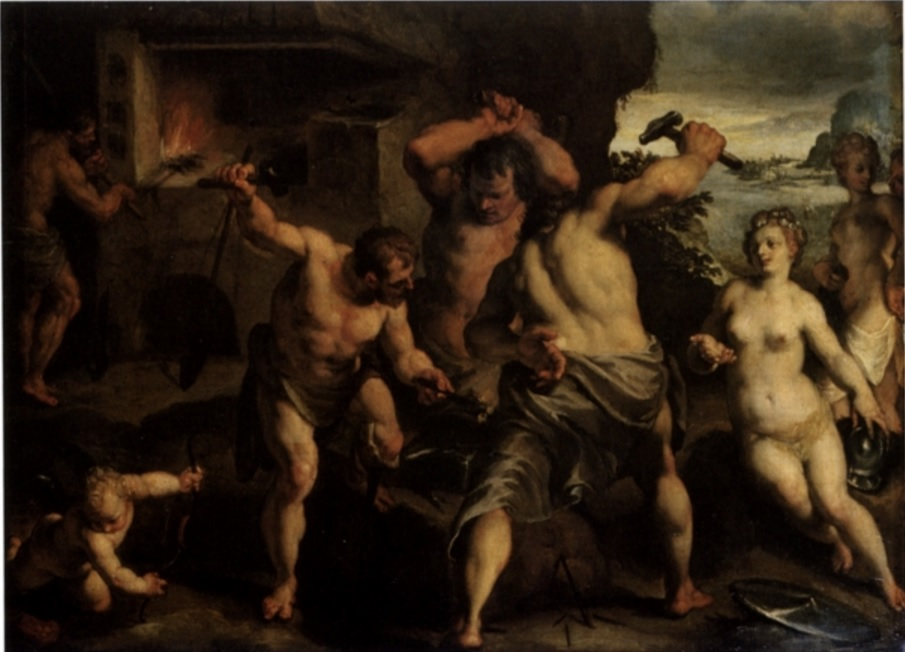
Venus in the Forge of Vulcan, by Felice Riccio (2,3 & 5)

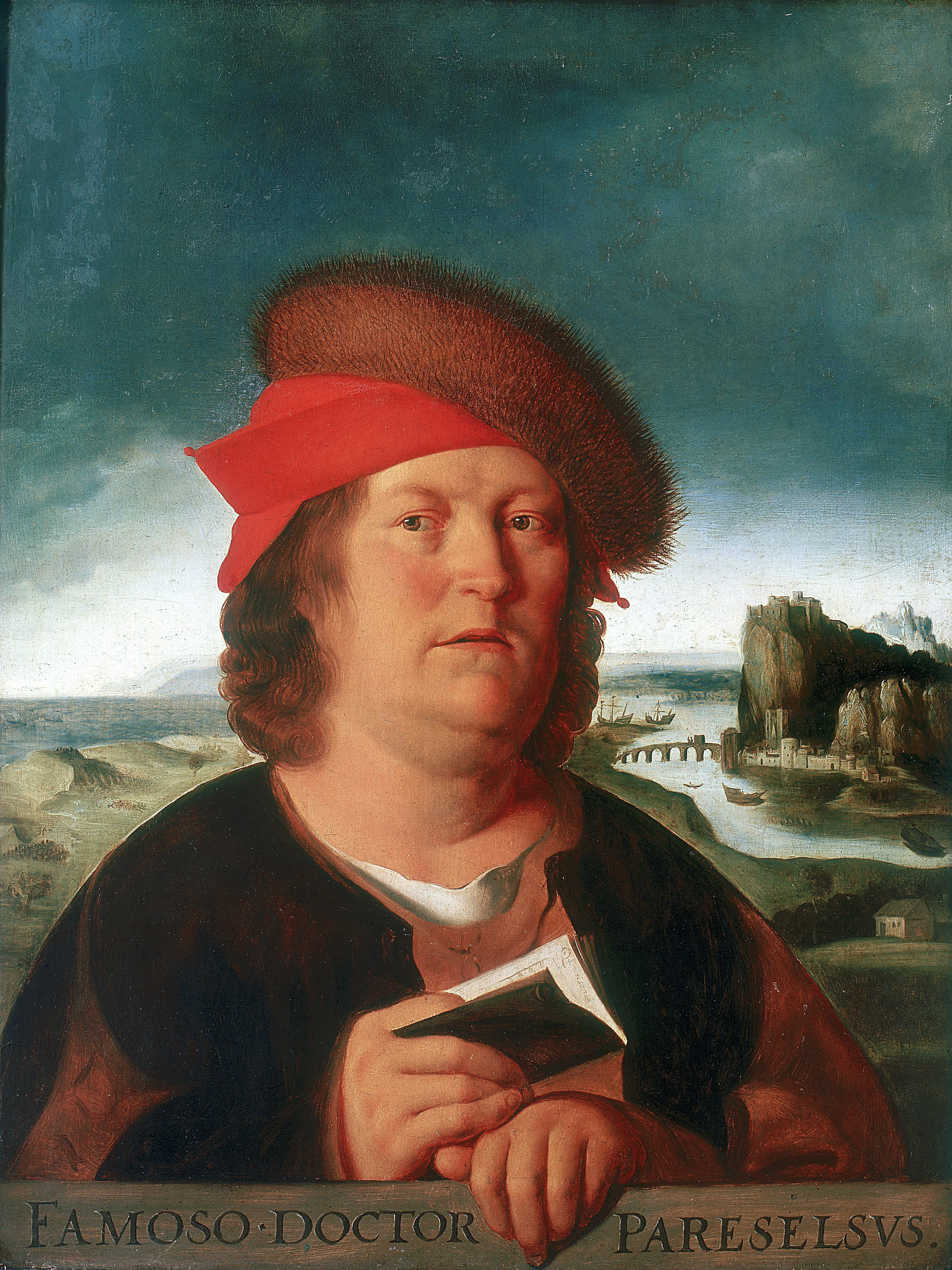
Lost portrait wrongly considered as that of Paracelsus, by Quentin Matsys (5)

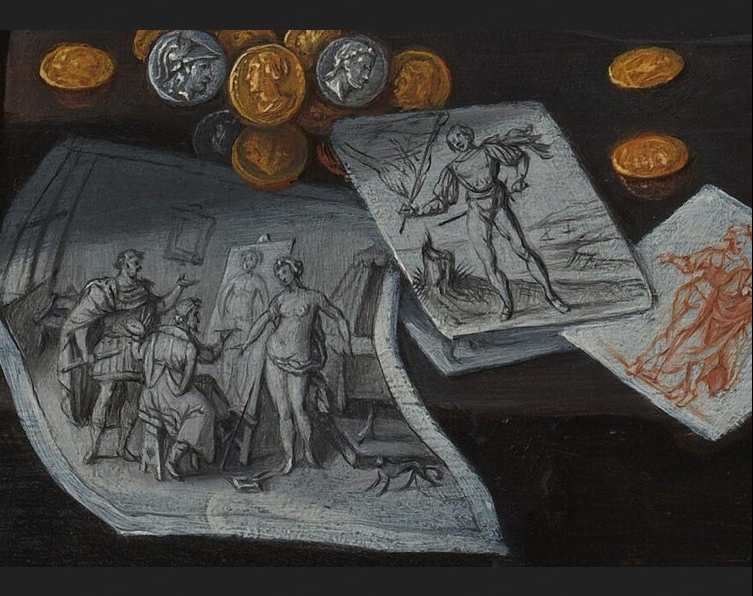
Drawing of Apelles painting Campaspe by Johannes Wierix (5)

== Maecenas ==
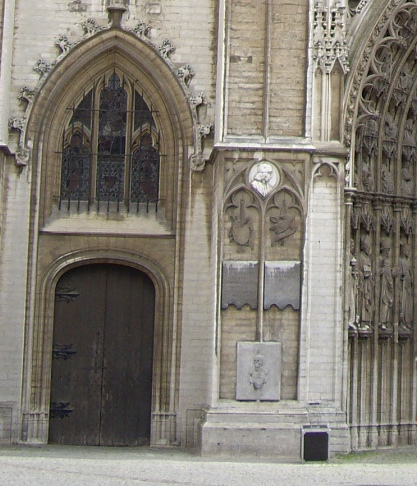
Skull memorial plaque for Quentin Metsys, financed by Van der Geest (1620)

Van der Geest also acted as a maecenas. He arranged for Rubens to get the order for a triptych for the Saint Walpurga church in Antwerp, which resulted in the Elevation of the Cross, now in the Cathedral of Antwerp. Similarly, the order for the 1630-1632 Triptych of Saint Ildephonsus, intended for the Saint James church, but now in the Kunsthistorisches Museum in Vienna, was given to Rubens through the influence of Van der Geest.

Van der Geest also financed a memorial plaque for Quentin Metsys, hung on the outside of the tower of the Antwerp Cathedral.

== See also ==
- Portrait of a Commander, a portrait owned by van der Geest.
