= Matsys =

Matsys is the surname of a family of Flemish painters:

- Quentin Matsys (1466–1530)
  - Cornelis Massijs (1508–c. 1556), son of Quentin Matsys
  - Jan Matsys (c. 1510–1575), son of Quentin Matsys
    - Quentin Metsys the Younger (c. 1543–1589), son of Jan Matsys
