= Calendar Clock Face =

Painting from c. 1500

Clock face with scenes of the months
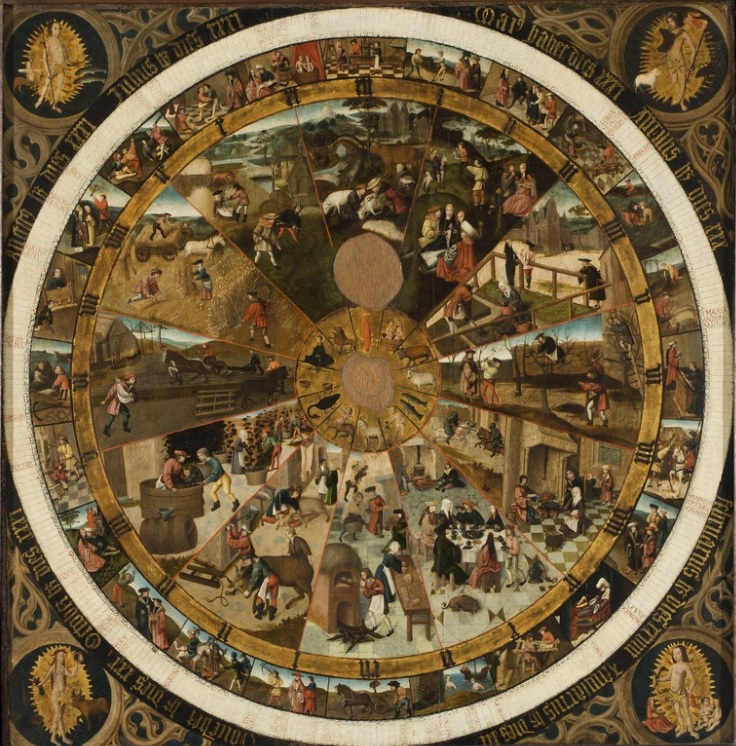
- Artist: Unknown
- Year: c.1500
- Medium: Oil on panel
- Dimensions: 122 x 122 cm
- Designation: protected masterpiece
- Location: M – Museum Leuven, Belgium , Leuven
- Accession: S/4/O

The Calendar Clock Face is an unusual painting from c.1500 by an unknown painter in the collection of the M – Museum Leuven. The moveable parts and all polychromy has been removed in the course of centuries.

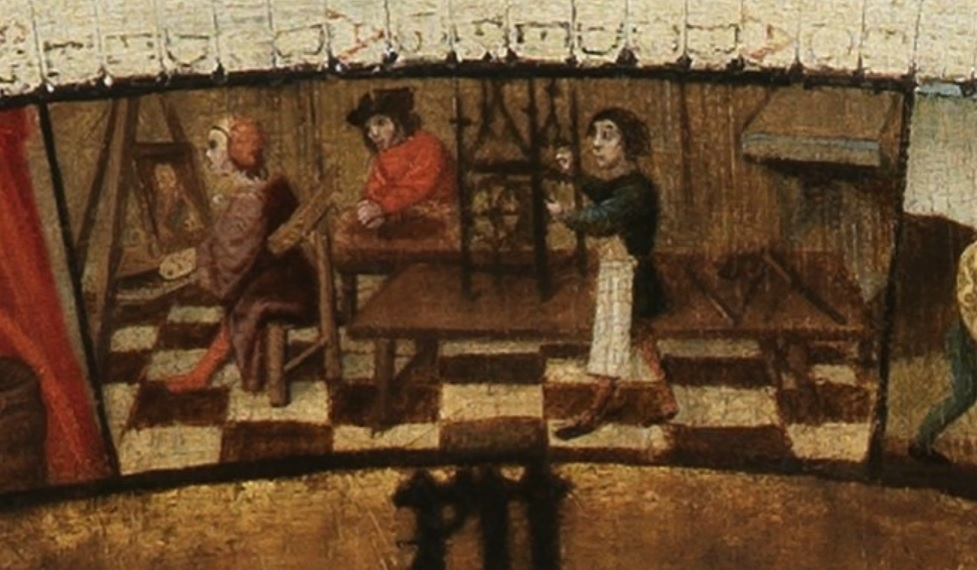
Topmost compartment with the Massijs brothers

Nothing is known of the clock face before it was discovered and documented by Leuven archivist Edward Van Even in the 19th century. He was a friend of William Henry James Weale, who included it in his 1902 Bruges exhibition of Flemish primitives with the following entry: "284. A Clock Face. This dial was executed around 1510 to be placed on a clock wrought by Josse Metsys. The decoration is divided into six concentric circles. The first circle shows the twelve zodiac signs in gold. The second circle shows twelve scenes of various occupations of each of the twelve months; the third circle, hours; and the fourth circle portrays in 24 compartments, the joys and miseries of human life. The fifth circle gives the division of the year in 365 calendar days; and the sixth circle shows the names of months. At the four corners, the four planets are represented by symbolic characters. In the topmost compartment of the fourth circle, the three brothers Massijs are seen: Josse, the eldest, busy mounting a church clock; Quentin, painting a portrait; and Jan, grinding colors. Oak. H. 122. L. 122. Mr. Edward van Even, Leuven. See E. van Even, Leuven in the past and in the present, p. 206."

== Provenance ==
The painting arrived in the Leuven city collection via the Demunter bequest in 1938 and has been in the museum since 1976.

Since its discovery many different theories about the painting have been made. It is similar in size to The Seven Deadly Sins and the Four Last Things by Hieronymus Bosch:

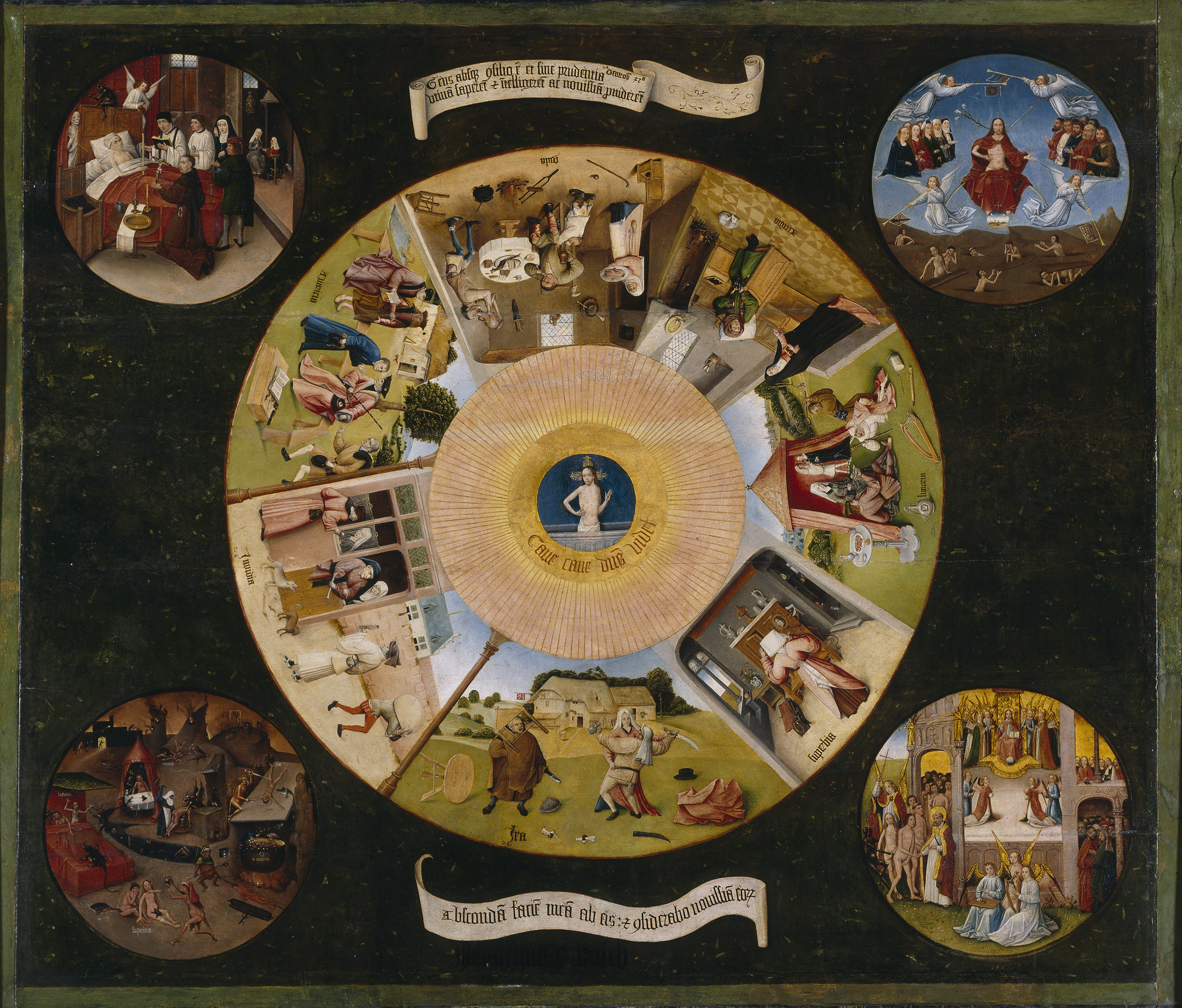
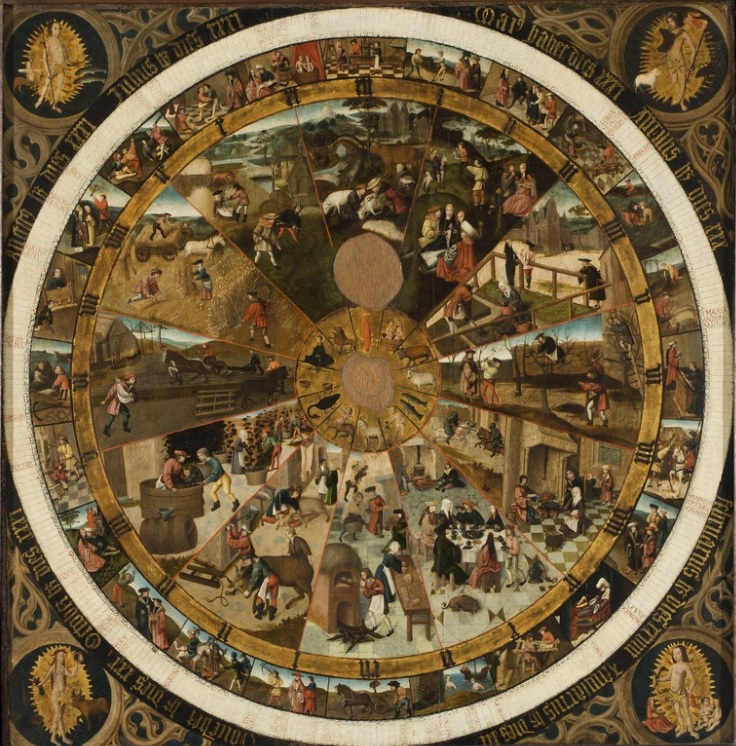
