= Flora (Jan Massys) =

1559 painting by Jan Massys

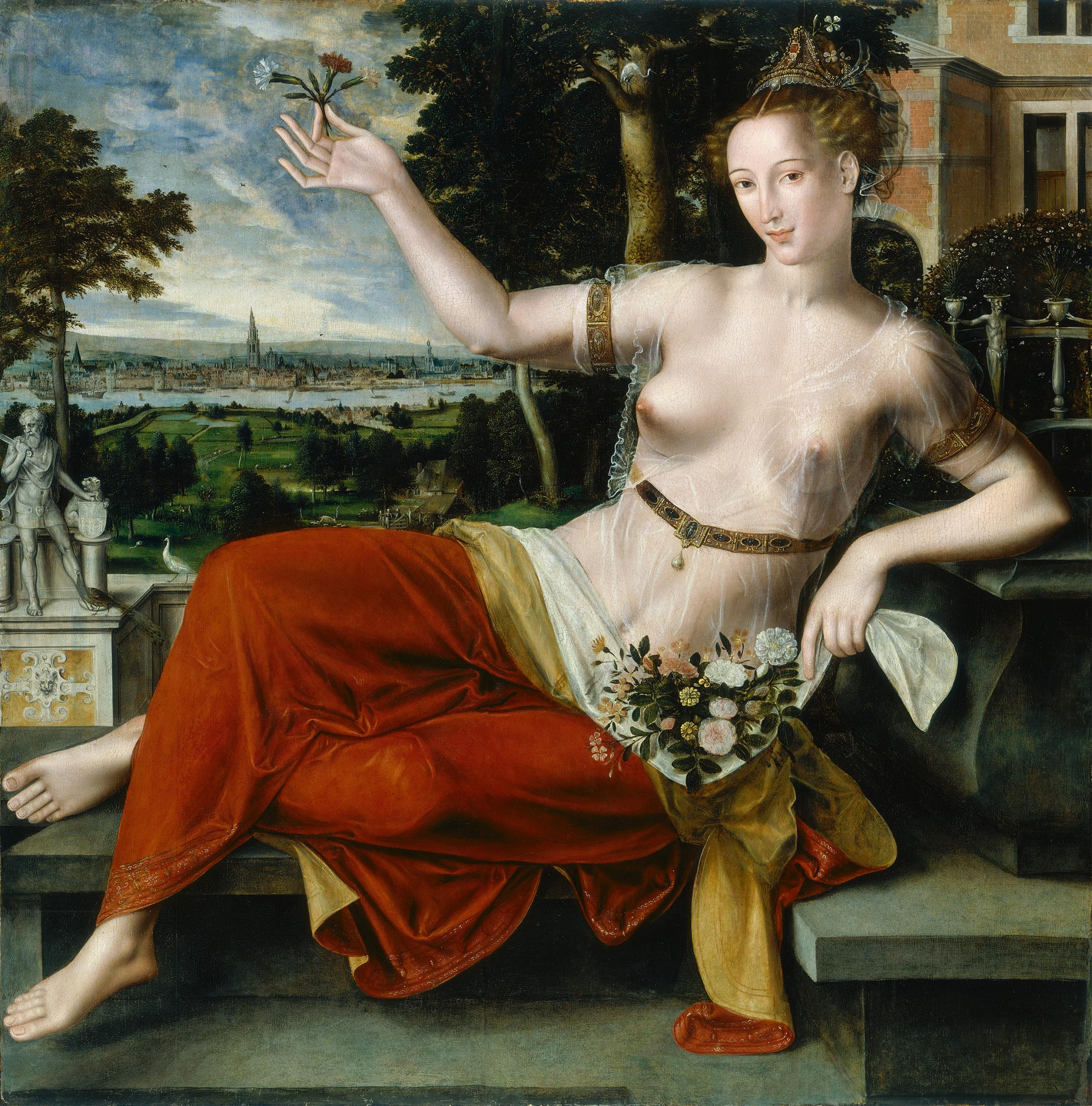
- Artist: Jan Massys
- Year: 1559
- Type: oil paint on oak
- Dimensions: 113.2 cm × 112.9 cm (44.6 in × 44.4 in)
- Location: Hamburger Kunsthalle, Hamburg

Flora is an oil on wood painting completed in 1559 by the Flemish painter Jan Massys, which is now in the collection of the Hamburger Kunsthalle.

The work depicts Flora, the Roman goddess of flowers and prosperity, sitting contentedly in a garden holding up a small bunch of red and white carnations, representing love and good fortune. They are positioned in the composition to hover above a landscape of the distant port of Antwerp on the River Scheldt. The sense of contented harmony is an allegory of the peace and prosperity of the city, to which Flora appears to be adding her own blessing.

Massys had a reputation as a painter of the female nude, which he painted in a style reminiscent of the school of Fontainebleau, with which he had been associated. The view of Antwerp may have been executed by Jan's brother Cornelis, a landscape specialist.

== See also ==
- 100 Great Paintings, 1980 BBC series
