= Shakespeare: Staging the World =

Coordinates: 51°31′9.91″N 0°7′37.47″W

The exhibition's catalogue.

Shakespeare: Staging the World was an exhibition at the British Museum about the world of Shakespeare, showing the way that he portrayed the world in his plays and related it to the events and politics of contemporary London. It was produced as part of the World Shakespeare Festival and ran from 19 July to 25 November 2012.

== Reception ==
The exhibition was well received by the critics and press. Katherine Duncan-Jones wrote, "...the exhibition has something for everyone, and deserves more than one visit." Michael Billington wrote, "What I like about the exhibition is that so many of the artefacts, including paintings, maps, globes, domestic objects and military weapons, relate to specific images in Shakespeare's plays. ... It's a brilliant exhibition ...".

The book accompanying the exhibition, by the Shakespeare scholar Jonathan Bate and Dora Thornton, Renaissance curator at the museum, was especially praised. Richard Dorment, theatre critic of the Daily Telegraph, wrote, "The catalogue by Bate and Thornton is well worth reading for its own sake, and once you start you won’t be able to stop." Brian Sewell wrote, "... the catalogue should be in every school library in the land. ... every student of English literature should have his own copy and that the book should never go out of print."

== Objects ==
The objects exhibited included: the Blacas Cameo, the Dunstable Swan Jewel, Royal Gold Cup, Brooch of Lorn, and the Metsys Siena Sieve Portrait of Elizabeth I.

== Catalogue ==
- Bate, Jonathan; Thornton, Dora (2012). Shakespeare: Staging the World. British Museum London/Oxford University Press New York. ISBN 978-0-7141-2824-5.
