= The Money Changer and His Wife =

1514 painting by Quentin Matsys

The Money Lender and His Wife
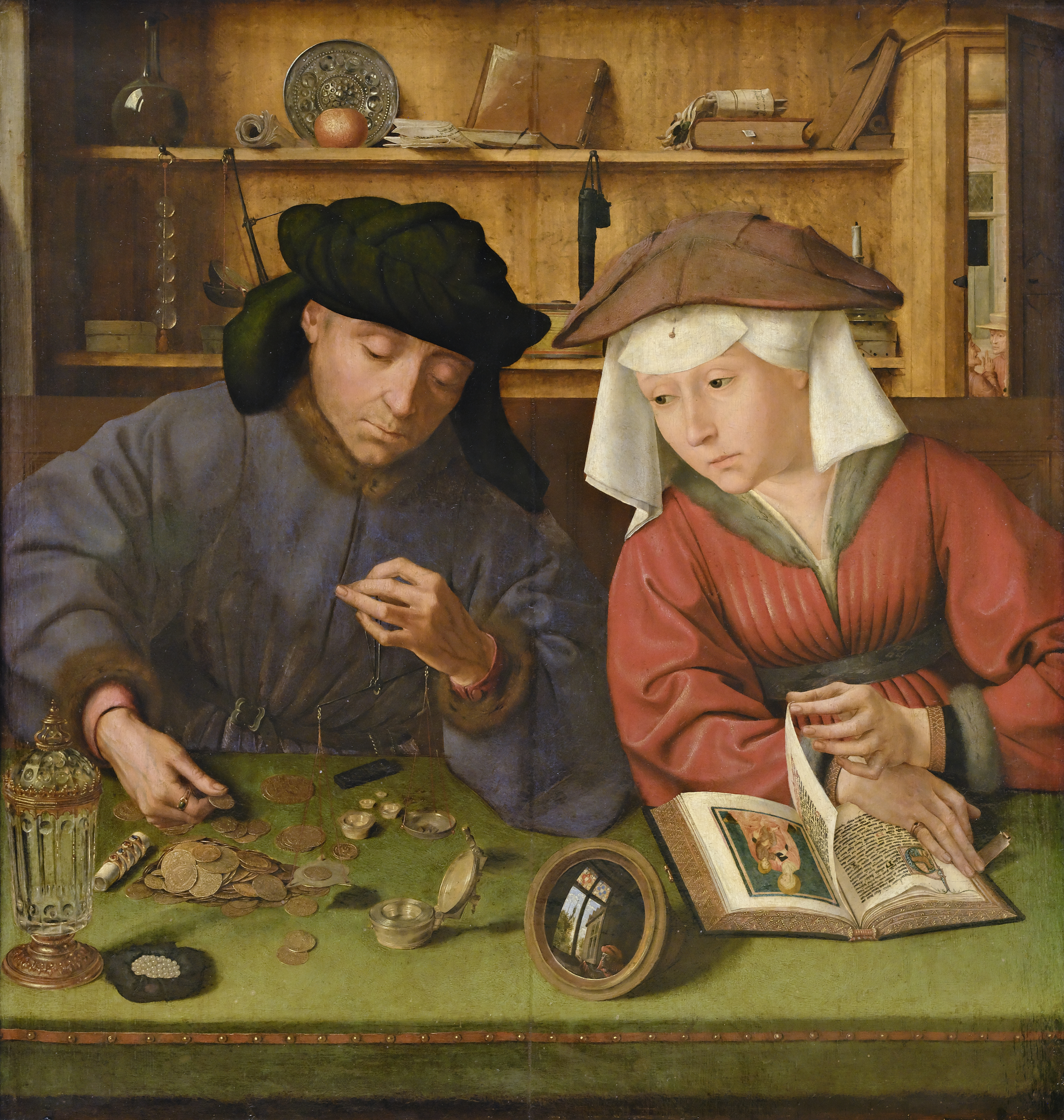
- Artist: Quentin Matsys
- Year: 1514
- Medium: Oil on panel
- Dimensions: 70.5 cm × 67 cm (27.8 in × 26 in)
- Location: Louvre, Paris

The Money Changer and His Wife is a 1514 oil-on-panel painting by the Flemish Renaissance artist Quentin Matsys, currently in the Louvre.

== Painting ==
A man, who is weighing the jewels and pieces of gold on the table in front of him sits next to his wife who is reading a book of devotion with an illustration of the Virgin and Child. The couple is not dressed as members of nobility, but rather as well-to-do burghers of Antwerp, where the painting was made. At the time, Antwerp had grown with the influx of many southern immigrants fleeing the Spanish Inquisition. Among this international community there was a demand for money-changers and money-lenders, as international commerce was increasing in the port city.

The same motif was used 25 years later by Matsys' follower, the painter Marinus van Reymerswaele.

This painting was copied in a painting of the gallery of Cornelis van der Geest by Willem van Haecht a century later in the 1620s. Van der Geest was an admirer of Matsys' work and owned several of his paintings, including The Moneylender and His Wife. He also commemorated Matsys' hundredth death anniversary with a new plaque in the Antwerp Cathedral.

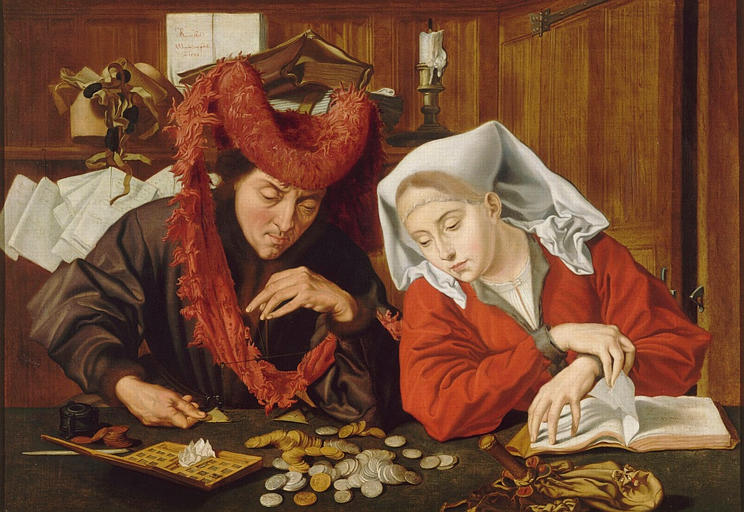
Version by Reymerswaele, Musée des Beaux-Arts de Nantes

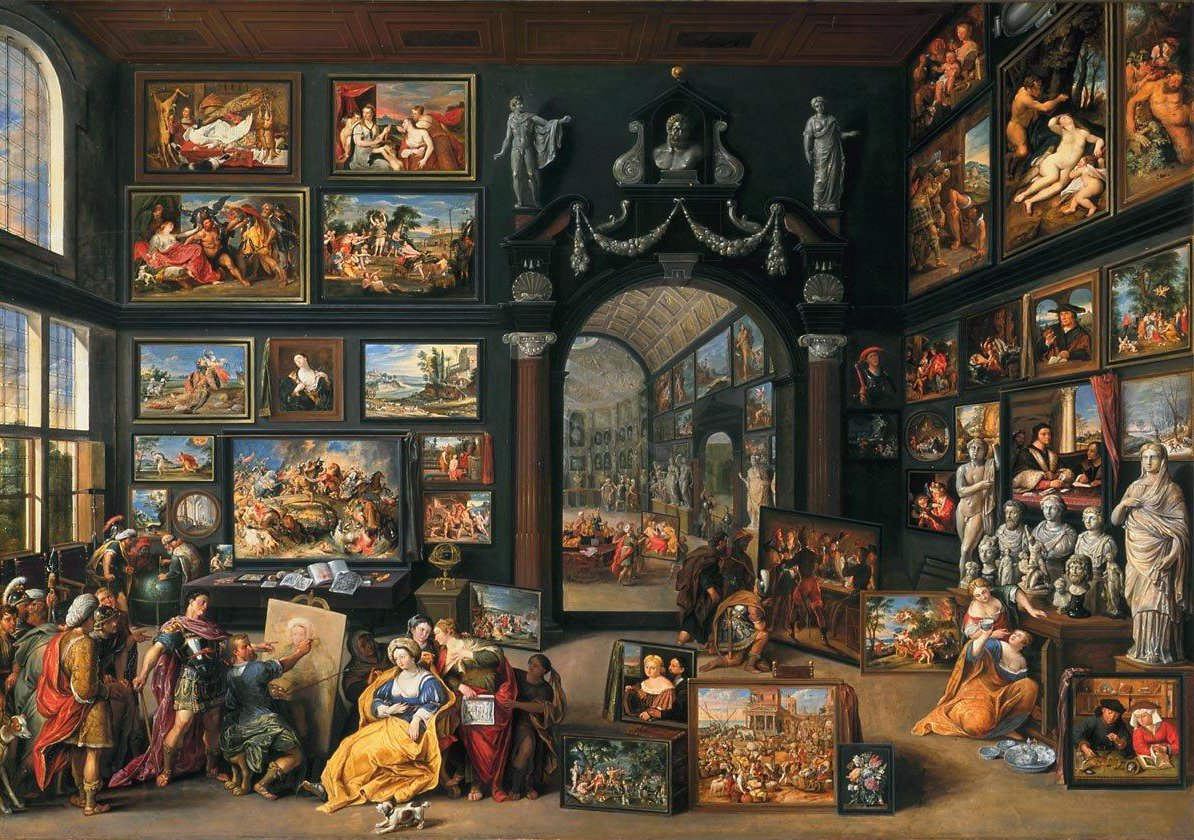
Version by Haecht, where this painting can be seen lower right, Mauritshuis
