= Joiners' Guild Altarpiece =

c. 1511 painting by Quentin Matsys

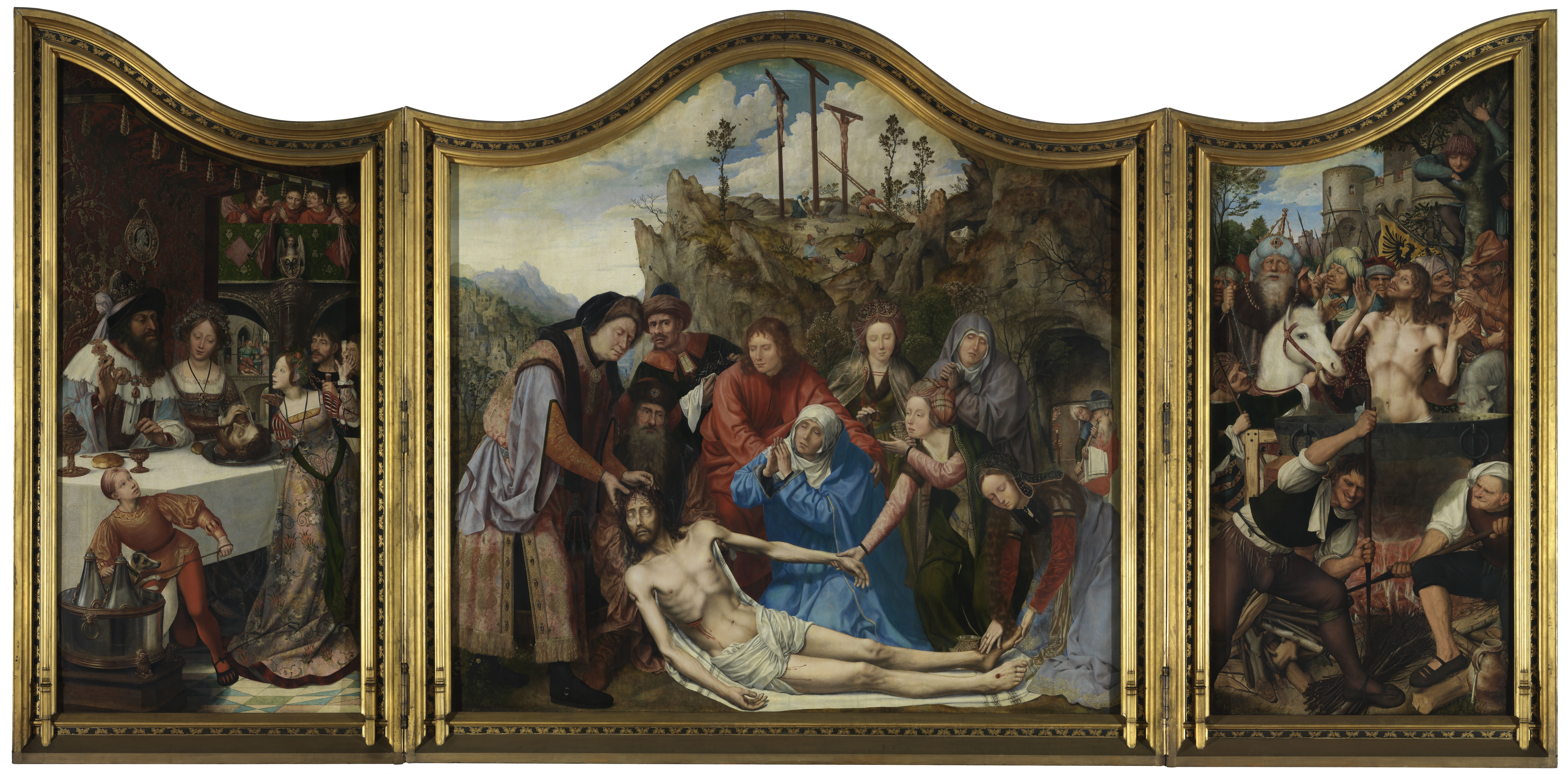
Joiner's Guild Altarpiece (c. 1511) by Quentin Matsys

The Joiners' Guild Altarpiece is an altarpiece by Quentin Matsys, executed c. 1511, produced for the eponymous guild in the aftermath of its split from the Coopers' Guild in 1497. It is now in the Royal Museum of Fine Arts, Antwerp.

It is sometimes also known as the Passion Altarpiece or the Martyrdom Altarpiece after the scenes of the martyrdoms of John the Baptist and John the Evangelist on the side panels. Both these saints were patrons of carpenters and also appeared in grisaille on the outside of the side panels. The central panel shows the Lamentation over the Dead Christ.

== Commission ==
The new guild first approached Peterceels and Van Kessel, two carvers active in Leuven, but this and a further commission to a sculptor in Antwerp in 1503 all fell through. In 1508 the commission was transferred to Massijs, who had already produced a now-lost altarpiece showing the Descent from the Cross for the Coopers' Guild The contract between the joiners' guild and Massijis still survives, stipulating a payment of 300 guilders to the artist, though when the painting was finally delivered on 26 August 1511 it decided instead to set up a fund for Quinten and Catharina, the artist's children by his first marriage to Alijt van Tuylt.

== Provenance ==
The altarpiece survived a huge fire in the church nineteen years after its installation as well as a wave of iconoclasm in 1566. Both Philip II of Spain and Elizabeth I of England tried to buy the work, but Maerten de Vos managed to convince the town council to buy the work to prevent its going abroad. It was briefly shown in the city's town hall before being placed on the Besnijdeniskapel altar in its original cathedral in 1590 - that chapel was used by the city's magistrates. During the French Revolution the Antwerp-based painter Willem Herreyns prevented the work from being publicly auctioned and taken to Paris by the French occupying troops. In 1798 it was transferred to the École Centrale des Deux Nèthes. At that time the painting, its marble base and two copper covers were valued at 600 florins by the French commissioner. It finally ended up in its current home

== Bibliography ==
- (in Dutch) A.J.J. Delen, in Koninklijk Museum voor Schone Kunsten - Antwerpen. Beschrijvende Catalogus. I. Oude meesters, 1948, p. 192-193.
- (in Dutch) Koninklijk Muzeum van Schoone Kunsten. Beschrijvend Catalogus. I. Oude meesters, 1905, p. 204-205.
- (in French) Catalogue du Musée d’Anvers. Publié par le Conseil d’administration de l’académie Royale des Beaux-Arts, 1857, nr. 36.
- (in French) Catalogue du Musée d’Anvers. Publié par le Conseil d’administration de l’académie Royale des Beaux-Arts, 1849, nr. 36.
- (in French) Catalogue du Musée d’Anvers. Publié par le Conseil d’administration de l’académie Royale des Beaux-Arts, 1845, nr. 36.
- (in French) Notice des tableaux exposés au Musée d’Anvers, Anvers: IMPRIMERIE DE PHILIPPE VILLE, 1829, nr. 2, 3, 4.
- (in French) Notice des Tableaux exposés au Musée d’Anvers. De l’Imprimerie de Philippe Ville, 1827, nr. 2, 3, 4.
- (in French) Notice des tableaux dont se compose Le Musée d’Anvers, Anvers: De l’Imprimerie de H.P. VANDER HEY, 1820, nr. 2 .
- (in French) Notice des tableaux exposés au Musée d’Anvers, Anvers : l’imprimerie de H.P. Vander Hey, 1817, nr. 6.
