= Ill-Matched Marriage =

Painting by a follower of Quentin Matsys

Ill-Matched Marriage (The Marriage Contract)
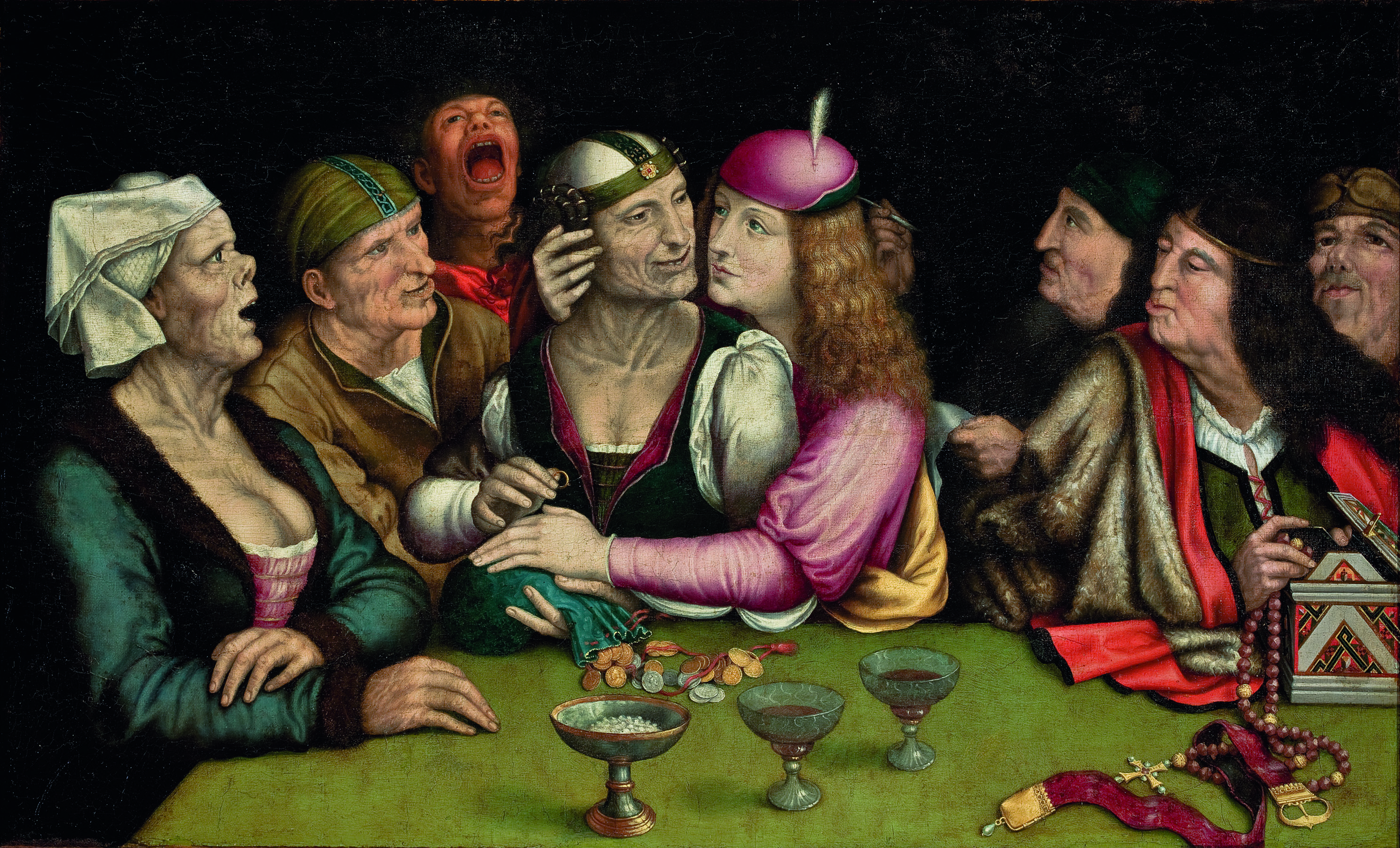
- Artist: Follower of Quentin Matsys
- Year: 1525–1530
- Medium: Oil on panel
- Dimensions: 54 cm × 89 cm (21 in × 35 in)
- Location: São Paulo Museum of Art, São Paulo

The Ill-Matched Marriage (also known as The Marriage Contract) is an oil painting by a follower of the early Netherlandish master Quentin Matsys, usually dated between 1525 and 1530. The panel, probably inspired by an original lost drawing of Leonardo da Vinci, illustrates a marriage for economic reasons between persons of different ages. The painting is in the São Paulo Museum of Art. It was donated to the museum in 1965 by Baron Hans Heinrich Thyssen-Bornemisza.

== Context and iconography ==
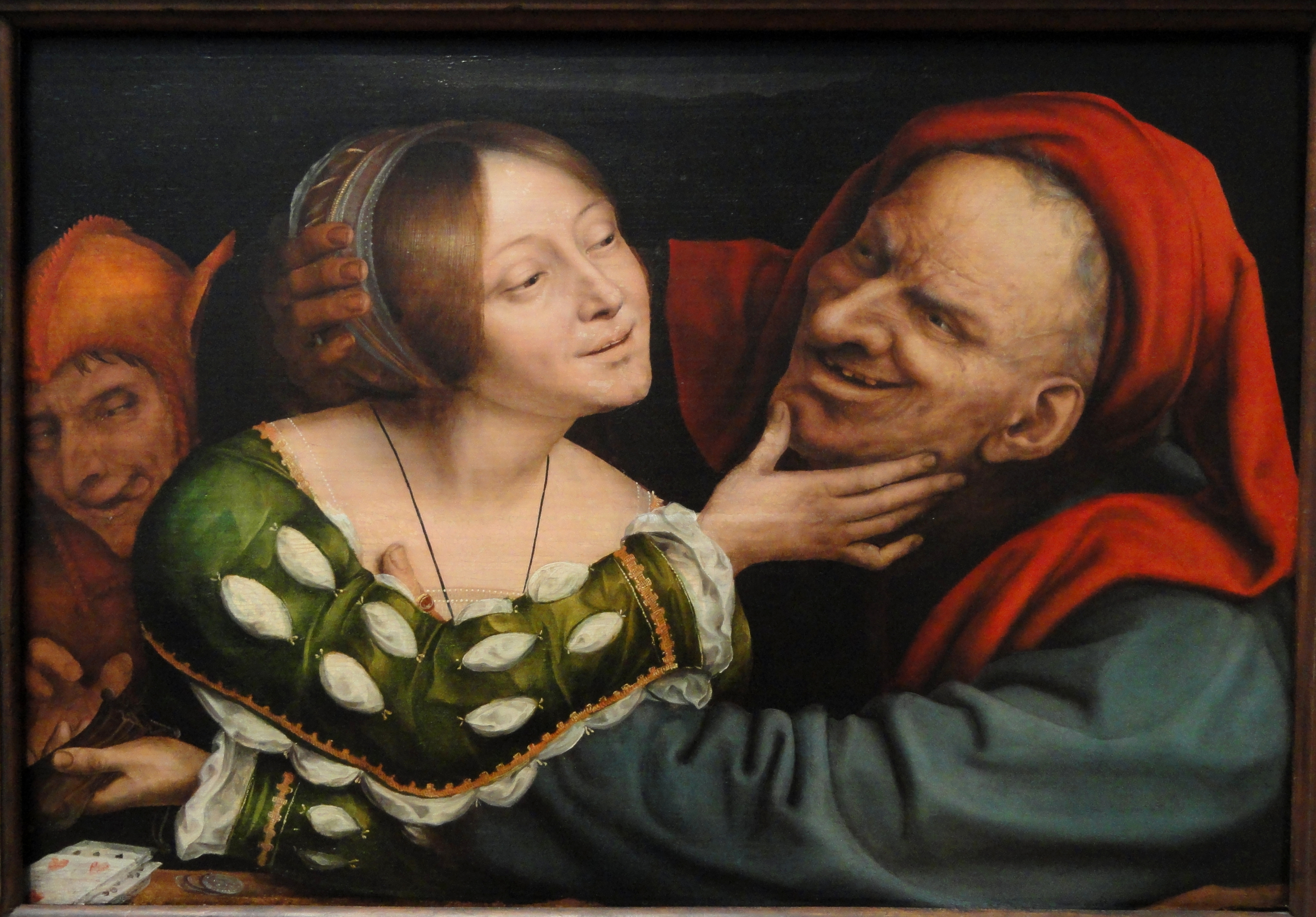
Ill-Matched Lovers, oil on panel, c. 1520–1525, National Gallery of Art, Washington

Many artists depicted the theme of marriage between people of differing age. Goya, Leonardo da Vinci, Dürer and Lucas Cranach the Elder dedicated works and studies to this subject. The representation of an old man marrying a younger woman is more common, but here Matsys depicts the opposite: a rich old woman marries a young man. Matsys made another version with the man older, now in the National Gallery of Art in Washington, D.C.

Being caressed by the young man, the old woman offers him a wedding ring with her right hand and opens her bag, smoothed by the man's left hand. The mockery, hypocrisy and foolishness of the scene is highlighted by the burlesque features of the characters and, in particular, by the figure at right, shown putting the necklace spread on the table inside a box.

The "grotesque marriage" is also present in the satirical literature, as in the poem Ship of Fools by Sebastian Brant (1494), which in its 52nd chapter tackles the "marriage-for-money" theme. The subject is treated by Erasmus of Rotterdam in his The Praise of Folly (1509).
