= The Seven Deadly Sins and the Four Last Things =

Paintings by Hieronymus Bosch or a follower

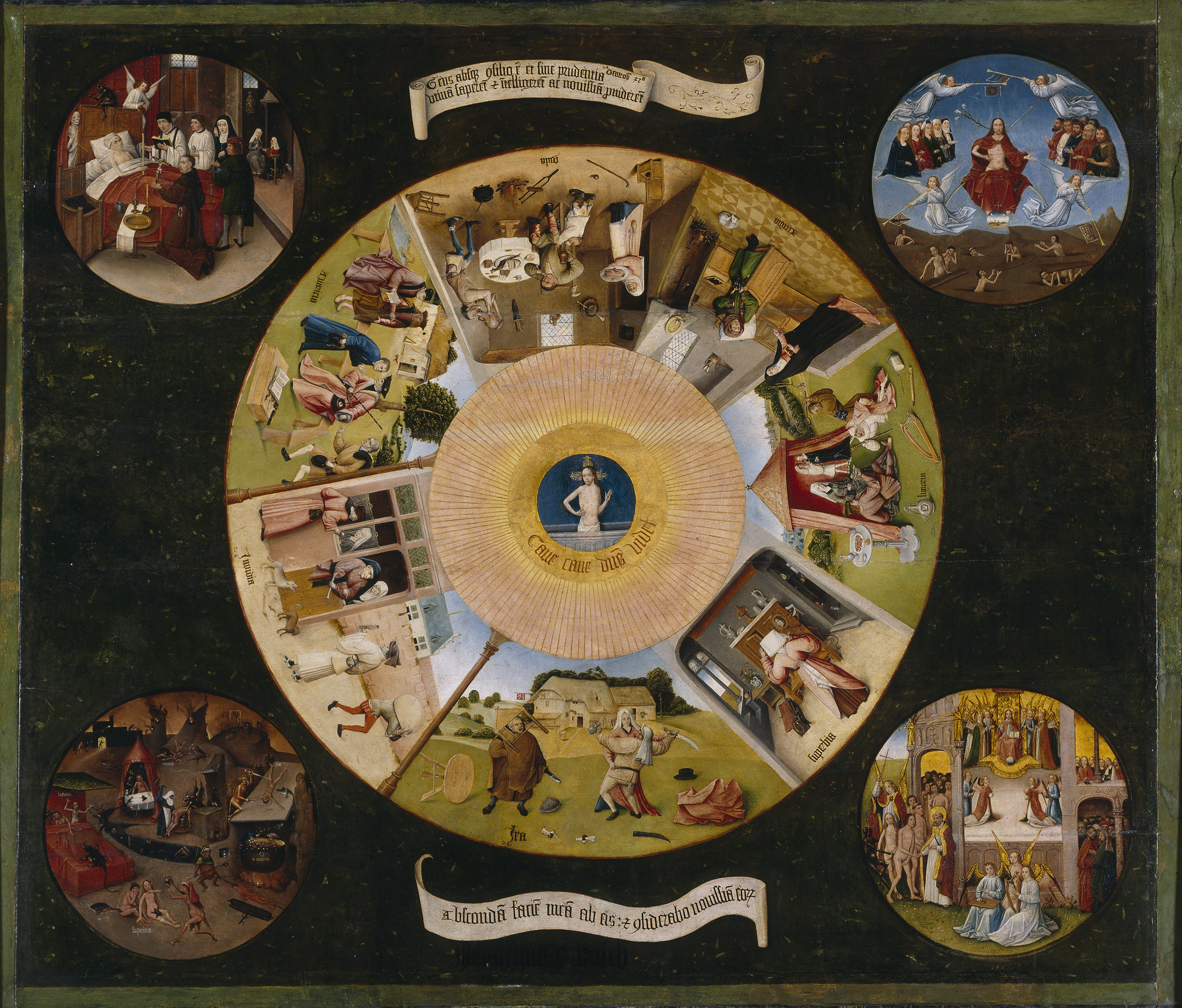
- Artist: Hieronymus Bosch (disputed)
- Year: c. 1500
- Medium: Oil on wood
- Dimensions: 120 cm × 150 cm (47 in × 59 in)
- Location: Museo del Prado, Madrid

The Seven Deadly Sins and the Four Last Things is a painting attributed to the Early Netherlandish artist Hieronymus Bosch or to a follower of his, completed around 1500 or later. Since 1898 its authenticity has been questioned several times. In 2015 the Bosch Research Conservation Project claimed it to be by a follower, but scholars at the Prado, where the painting is on display in a sealed case, dismissed this argument. The painting is oil on wooden panels and is presented in a series of circular images.

Four small circles, detailing the four last things—Death, Judgment, Heaven, and Hell—surround a larger circle in which the seven deadly sins are depicted: wrath at the bottom, then (proceeding clockwise) envy, greed, gluttony, sloth, extravagance (later replaced with lust), and pride, using scenes from life rather than allegorical representations of the sins.

At the centre of the large circle, which is said to represent the eye of God, is a "pupil" in which Christ can be seen emerging from his tomb. Below this image is the Latin inscription Cave cave d[omi]n[u]s videt ("Beware, Beware, The Lord Sees").

Above and below the central image are inscription in Latin of Deuteronomy 32:28–29, containing the lines "For they are a nation void of counsel, neither is there any understanding in them", above, and "O that they were wise, that they understood this, that they would consider their latter end!" below.

== Disputed authorship and dating ==
In 1560, Felipe de Guevara wrote about a pupil of Bosch, an unnamed discipulo (pupil), who was as good as his master and even signed his works with his master's name. Immediately after this, and without starting a new paragraph, Guevara refers to the painting of the Seven Deadly Sins as characteristic of his style. This led some scholars, as early as Dollmayr (1898) and most vocally Stechow (1966), to ascribe the work to this pupil.

Most experts have argued since, however, that given the highly ambiguous nature of the passage, Guevara had probably returned to a description of the works of Bosch himself. Furthermore, the accuracy and authority of Guevara is suspect: when in 1570 Guevara's heirs sold a copy of The Haywain Triptych to Philip II of Spain, it was made clear that Guevara had regarded that work as the original painted by Bosch himself, whilst nowadays it is known that his was a copy (displayed in El Escorial), of the original hanging in Prado. Philip II of Spain himself purchased the work (prior to 1560, probably from a monastery art sale) in the belief that The Seven Deadly Sins was a Bosch original, and he always regarded it as such. It was his favourite Bosch painting and it hung in his own bedroom in El Escorial. When he donated the painting to El Escorial in 1574, it was cataloged as being a Bosch original; Silva Maroto argued that it is hard to believe that Guevara would question the authorship of Phillip's favourite Bosch in such an ambiguous passage, which as Maroto pointed out is part of a manuscript that remained unpublished until 1788.

The alleged poor quality of the drawing had led to the incorrect belief it dates from Bosch's early period. The attribution to the discipulo was revived in the catalogue of the 2001 Bosch exhibition in Rotterdam, by Vermet and Vandenbroeck, who also suggested that several of the costumes suggest a much later date, around 1500, so that the awkward drawing and execution cannot be attributed to youthful imperfection. They also noted that the painting is not on oak, adding to their doubts about the attribution to Bosch.

Nowadays, most art historians agree that the costumes point at a date in between 1505 and 1510; it is argued that the key characteristics of the underlying drawing, the way the pictorial surface was developed, and the variety of strokes are entirely consistent with Bosch's later paintings. Furthermore, the theme, symbolism and the composition itself is profoundly original, which would make it extremely unlikely that an unknown pupil could have painted it.

In 2005, Ed Hoffman argued for the work being a copy, perhaps ordered by Philip II of Spain after the original had been damaged. In his view, the amateurish style, the plump figures, the lack of white highlights and the fact that the wooden panel is not oak but poplar (which can't be dated with dendrochronology). An argument for the authenticity, or at least originality, of the work could be found in the pentimenti of the underpainting, which indicate it could not have been a simple faithful reproduction. In addition, there is no question the signature in the painting is that of Bosch himself, and not a forgery.

In October 2015, the Bosch Research and Conservation Project, which had been responsible, since 2007, for technical research on most of Bosch's paintings, rejected the attribution to Bosch and deemed it to be made by a follower, most likely the discipulo. In response, the Prado Museum stated that they still consider the piece to be authentic.

== Content ==
Each panel in the outer circle depicts a different sin. Clockwise from top (Latin names in brackets):

=== Seven Deadly Sins ===
1. Gluttony (gula): A drunkard swigs from a bottle while a fat man eats greedily, not heeding the plea of his equally obese young son, as his wife begrudgingly brings in a chicken or goose for them.
2. Sloth (acedia): A lazy man dozes in front of the fireplace while Faith appears to him in a dream, in the guise of a nun, to remind him to say his prayers.
3. Lust (luxuria): Two couples enjoy a picnic in a pink tent, with two clowns (right) to entertain them.
4. Pride (superbia): With her back to the viewer, a woman looks at her reflection in a mirror held up by a demon.
5. Wrath (ira): A woman attempts to break up a fight between two drunken peasants.
6. Envy (invidia): A couple standing in their doorway cast envious looks at a rich man with a hawk on his wrist and a servant to carry his heavy load for him, while their daughter flirts with a man standing outside her window, with her eye on the well-filled purse at his waist. The dogs illustrate the Flemish saying, "Two dogs and only one bone, no agreement".
7. Greed (avaricia): A crooked judge pretends to listen sympathetically to the case presented by one party to a lawsuit, while slyly accepting a bribe from the other party.

=== Four Last Things ===
- Death: Death is shown at the doorstep, personified as a grim reaper, along with an angel and a demon while the priest says the sinner's last rites,
- Heaven: The saved are entering Heaven, with Jesus and the saints, at the gate of Heaven an Angel prevents a demon from ensnaring a woman. Saint Peter is shown as the gatekeeper.
- Judgment: Christ is shown in glory while angels awake the dead
- Hell: demons torment sinners according to their sins.

== Details ==
=== Seven Deadly Sins ===
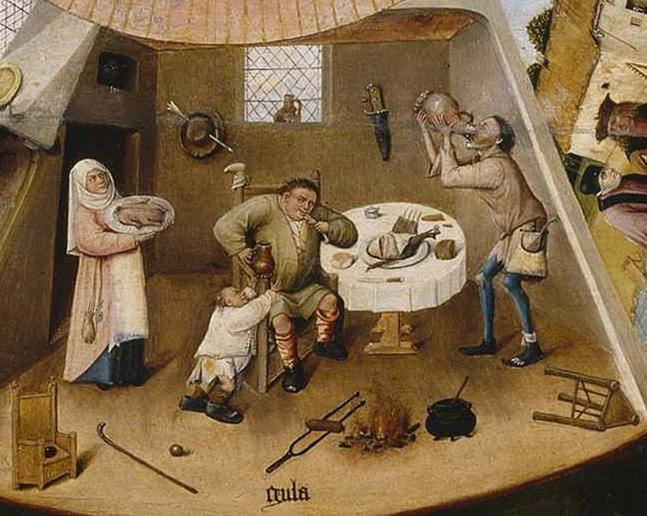
Gluttony (Gula)

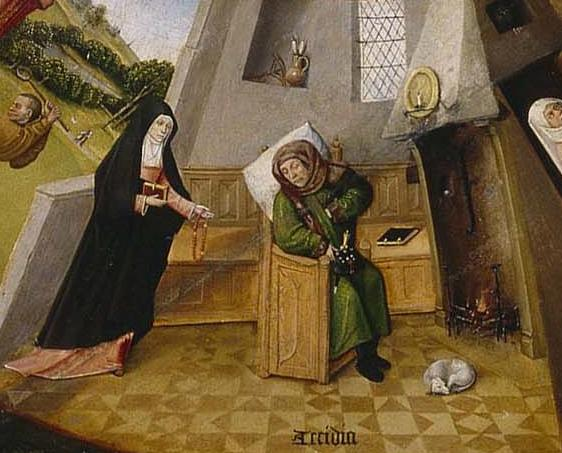
Sloth (Accidia)

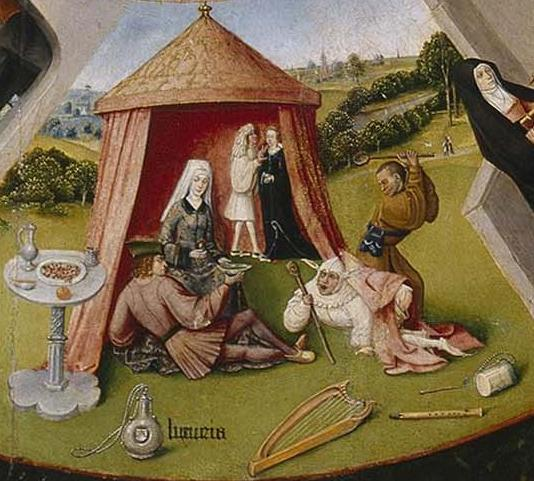
Lust (Luxuria)

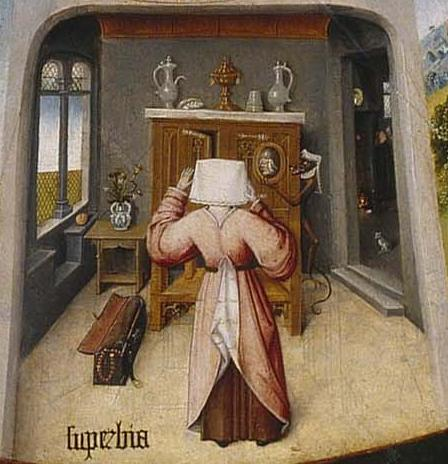
Pride (Superbia)

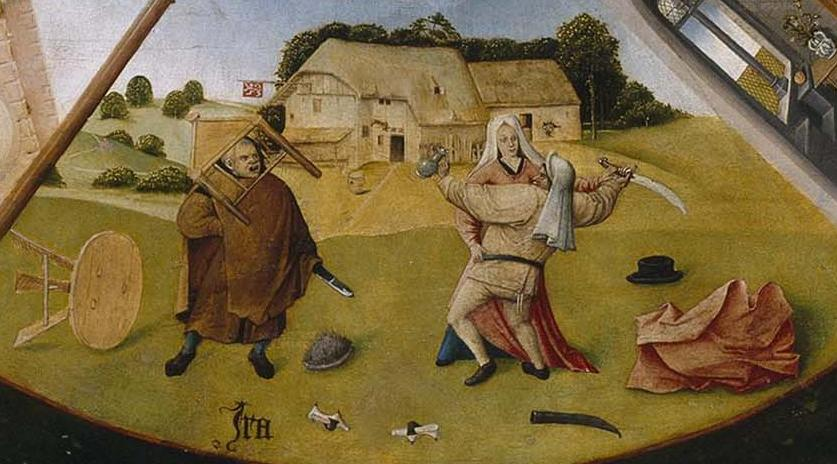
Wrath (Ira)

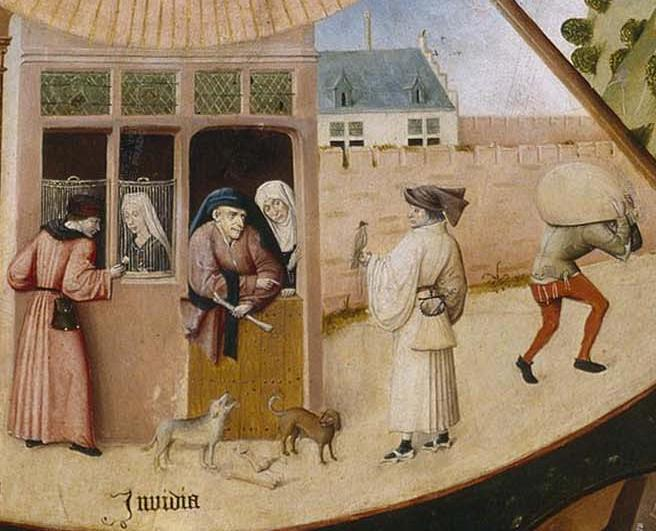
Envy (Invidia)

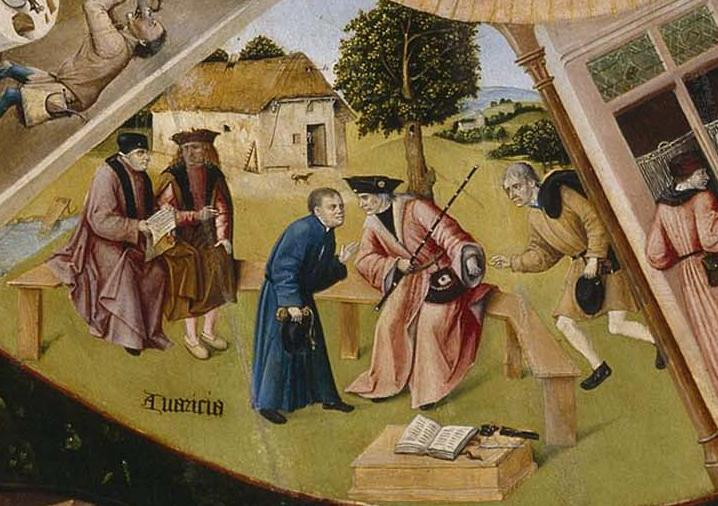
Greed (Avaricia)

=== Four Last Things ===
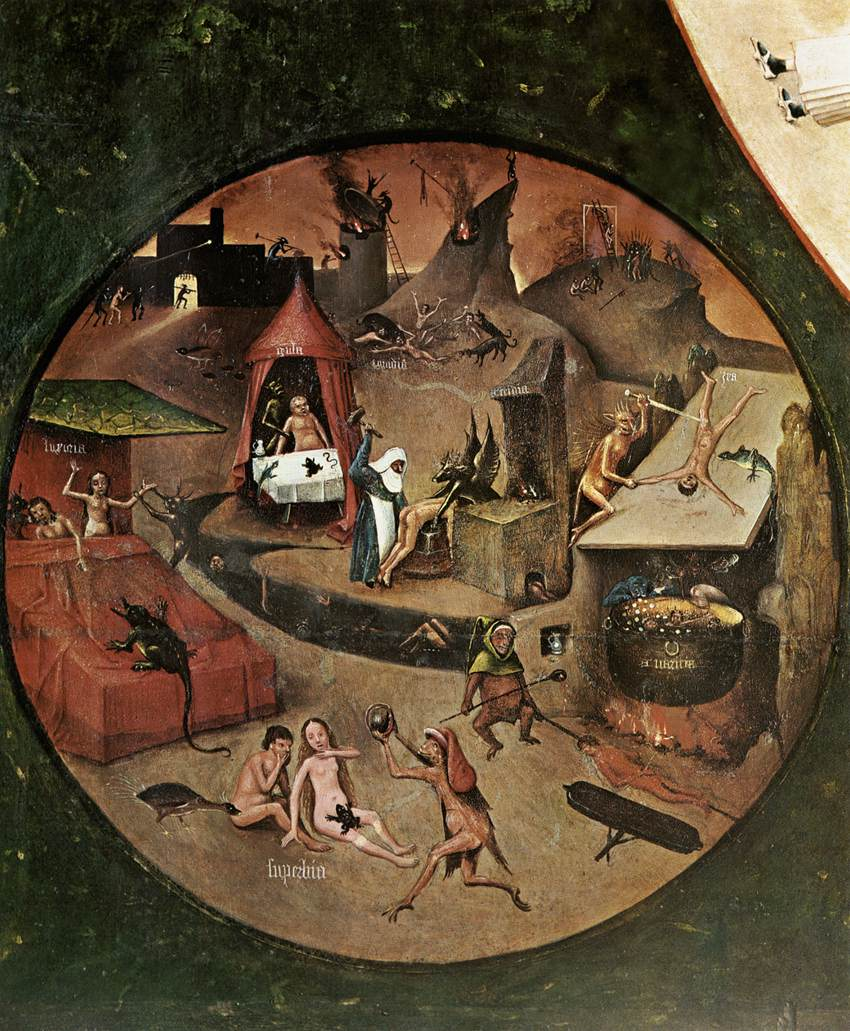
"Hell" and the punishment of the seven deadly sins.

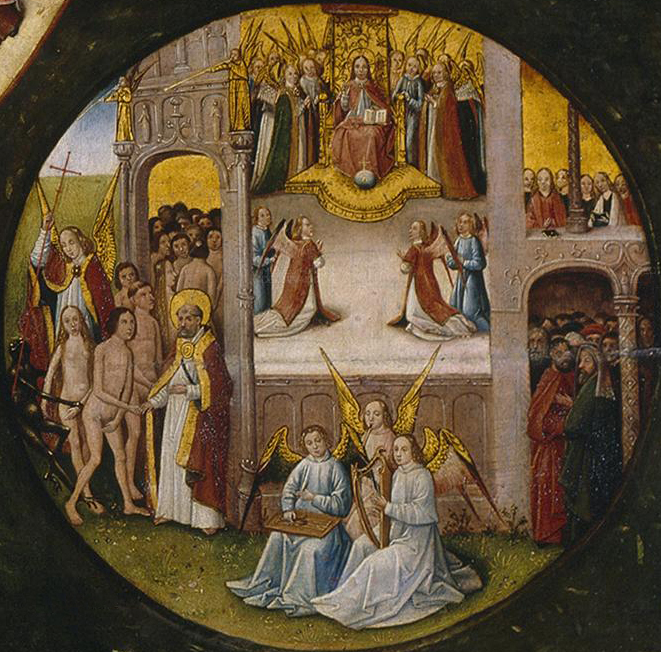
"Glory" or Heaven

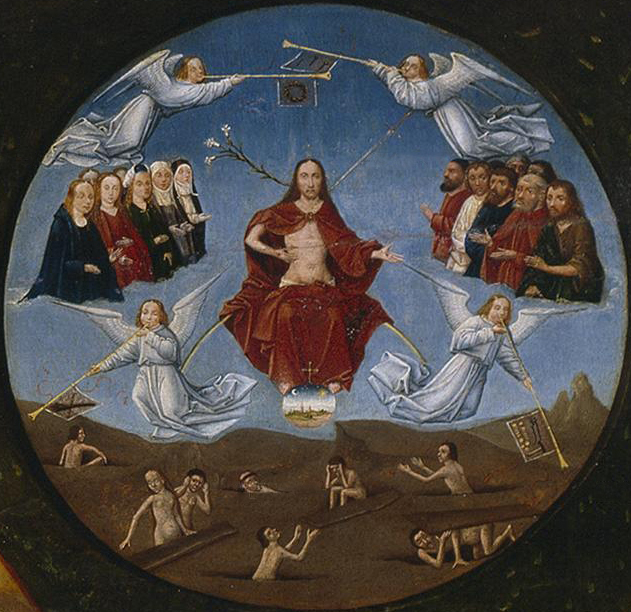
"Last Judgment"

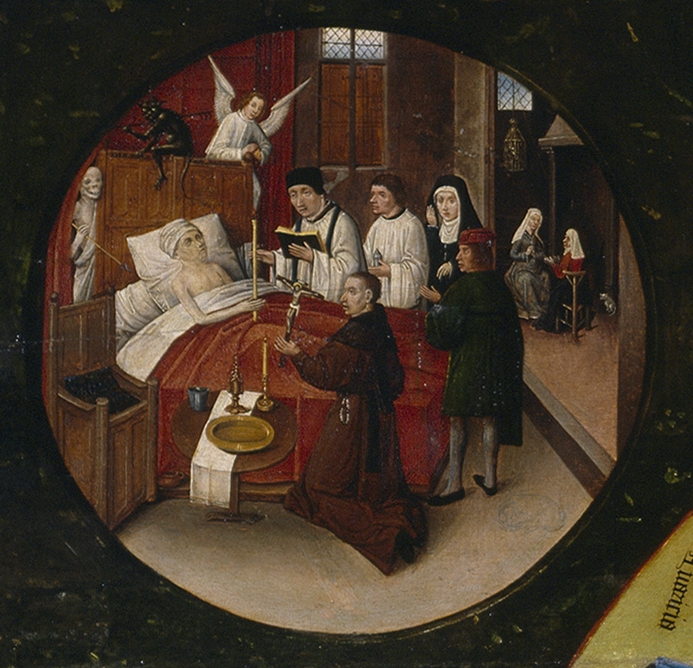
"Death"

== See also ==
- List of paintings by Hieronymus Bosch
- Calendar Clock Face, c. 1500 in the collection of M – Museum Leuven
- Rota Fortunae
- Bhavacakra, a similar diagram in Buddhism
- The Tricks of Leonardo da Vinci & Hieronymus Bosch. Xavier d'Hérouville & Aurore Caulier. December 2023. HAL Open Science
