= Quentin Matsys =

Flemish painter (1466–1530)

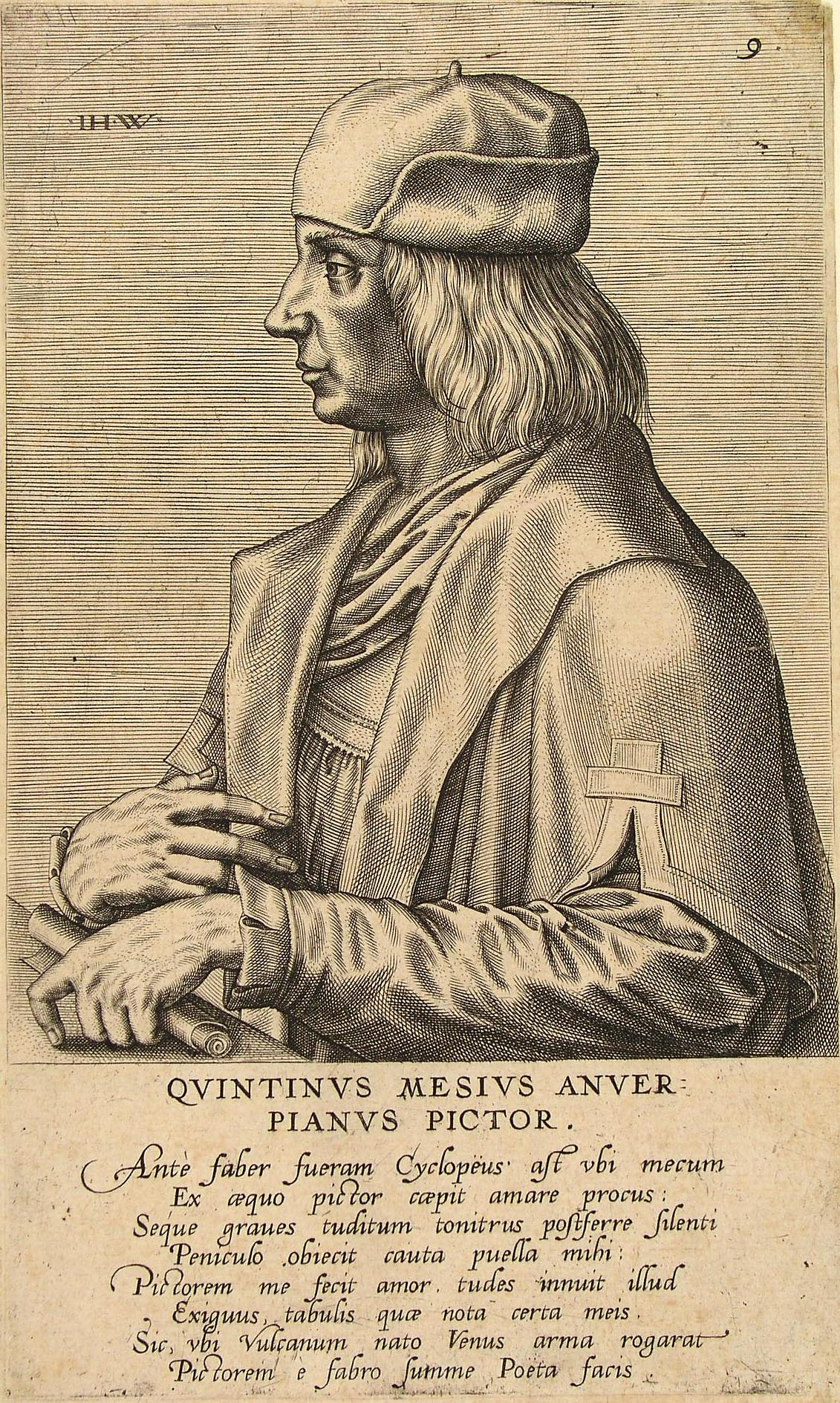
- Quentin Matsys, engraved by Johannes Wierix with Dominicus Lampsonius' poem about how Matsys' girlfriend preferred the quiet paintbrush to the heavy noise of hammering
- Born: 1466; Leuven, Duchy of Brabant
- Died: 1530 (aged 63–64); Antwerp, Duchy of Brabant
- Other names: Quentin Massys; Quentin Metsys; Kwinten Matsys; Quinten Matsijs
- Known for: Religious and satirical portraits
- Notable work: The Ugly Duchess
- Movement: Antwerp School

Quentin (Note: Sometimes Quinten or Kwinten.) Matsys (UK: /ˈmætsaɪs/ MAT-sysse, US: /ˈmɑːtsaɪs/ MAHT-sysse; also Massys or Metsys; Flemish: Quinten Matsijs [ˈkʋɪntə ˈmɑtsɛis]; 1466–1530) was a Flemish painter in the Early Netherlandish tradition. He was born in Leuven. According to tradition, he trained as an ironsmith before becoming a painter. Matsys was active in Antwerp for over 20 years, creating numerous works with religious roots and satirical tendencies. He is regarded as the founder of the Antwerp school of painting, which became the leading school of painting in Flanders in the 16th century. He introduced new techniques and motifs as well as moralising subjects without completely breaking with tradition.

== Early life ==
Most early accounts of Matsys' life are composed primarily of legend and very little contemporary accounts exist of the nature of his activities or character. According to J. Molanus' Historiae Lovaniensium, Matsys was known to be a native of Leuven with humble beginnings as an ironsmith. One of four children, Massys was born to Joost Matsys (d. 1483) and Catherine van Kincken sometime between 4 April and 10 September 1466. Legend states that Matsys abandoned his career as a blacksmith to woo his wife, who found painting to be a more romantic profession, though Karel van Mander claimed this to be false, and the real reason was a sickness during which he was too weak to work at the smithy and instead decorated prints for the carnival celebrations.

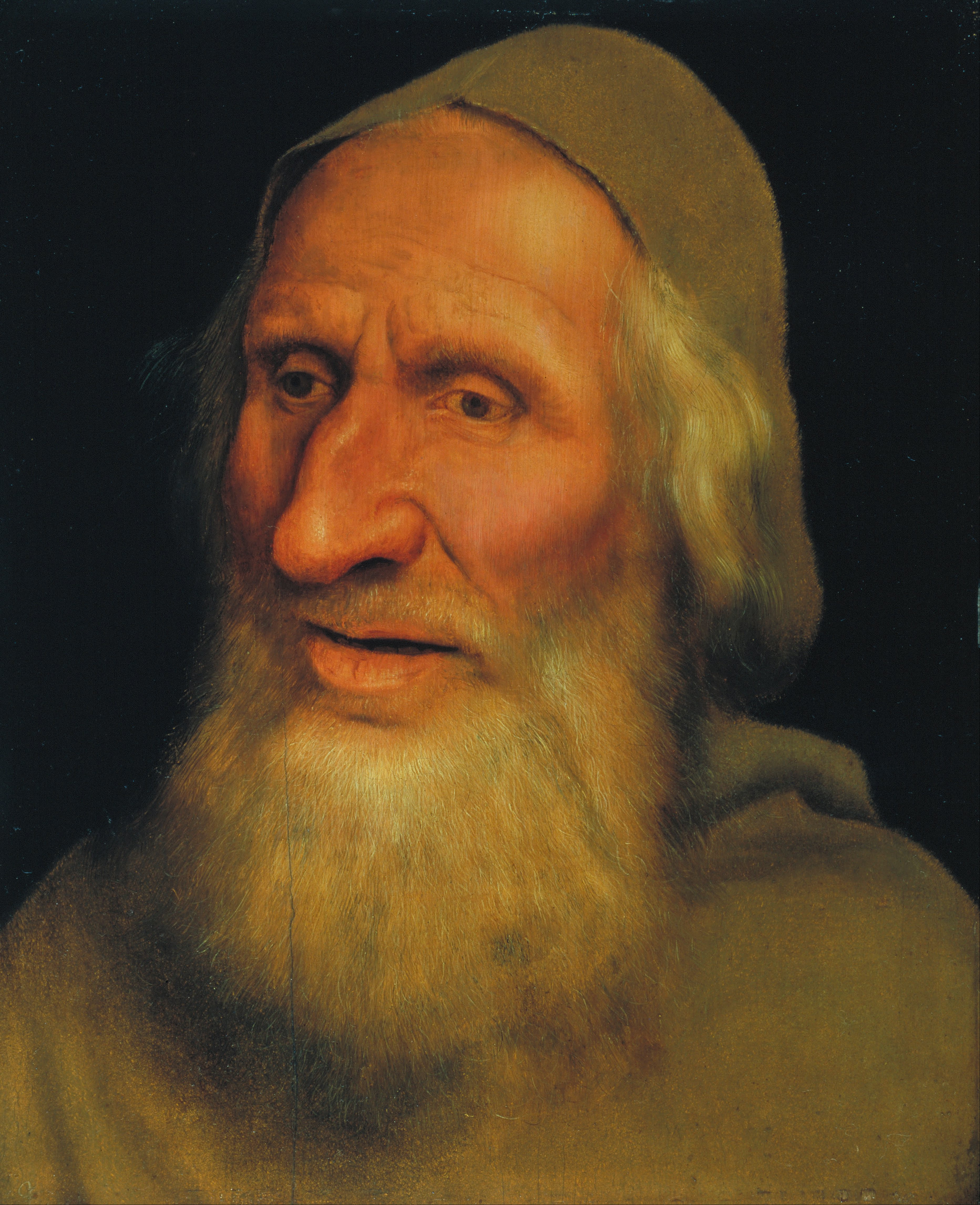
Head of an Old Man

Documented donations and possessions of Joost Matsys indicate that the family had a respectable income and that financial need was most likely not the reason Matsys turned to painting. During the period in which Matsys was active in Antwerp he took only four apprentices: a certain Ariaen whom certain art historians believe to be Adriaen van Overbeke (master in 1508), Willem Muelenbroec (registered in 1501), Eduart Portugalois (registered in 1504, master in 1506), and Hennen Boeckmakere (registered in 1510). It is widely believed that Joachim Patinir studied with Matsys at some point during his career and contributed to several of his landscapes (such as The Temptation of St. Anthony at the Prado Museum in Madrid). Lack of guild records during this time leaves Matsys' travels to Italy and other parts of the Low Countries as part of his training open to question. For the most part, foreign influences on Matsys are inferred from his paintings and are considered to be a large portion of the artist's training during the 16th century.

== Work in Leuven ==
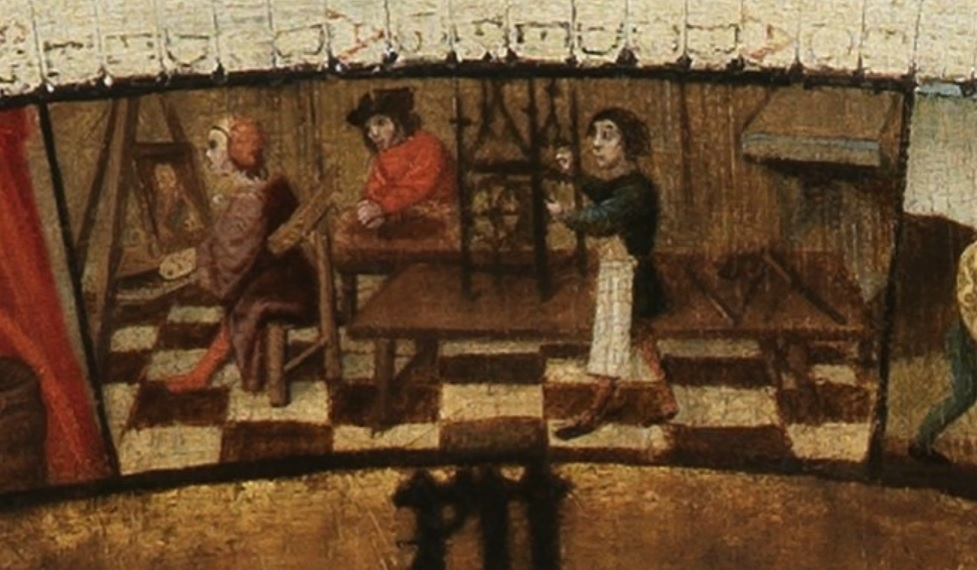
Detail of a c. 1500 Calendar Clock Face, which shows the artist with his 'brothers' Joost the clockmaker and Jan

During the greater part of the 15th century, the centres in which the painters of the Low Countries most congregated were Tournai, Bruges, Ghent and Brussels. Leuven gained prominence toward the close of this period, employing workmen from all of the crafts including Matsys. Not until the beginning of the 16th century did Antwerp take the lead which it afterward maintained against Bruges, Ghent, Brussels, Mechelen and Leuven. Because no guild records were kept prior to 1494 in Leuven there is no concrete proof that Matsys attained his master's status there; however, historians generally accept this to be the location of his early training because he had not been previously registered in Antwerp as an apprentice. As a member of Antwerp's Guild of Saint Luke, Matsys is considered to be one of its first notable artists. Existing records of guild laws and regulations from the 16th century indicate that it is highly unlikely that Matsys was self-taught, despite accounts in Carel van Mander's Schilderboeck (1604) stating that Matsys studied under no artist.

== Style ==
Although the roots of Matsys' training are unknown, his style reflects the artistic qualities of Dirk Bouts, who brought to Leuven the influence of Hans Memling and Rogier Van der Weyden. When Matsys settled at Antwerp at the age of twenty-five, his own style contributed importantly to reviving Flemish art along the lines of Van Eyck and Van der Weyden. Matsys departed from Leuven in 1491 when he became a master in the guild of painters at Antwerp. His most well known satirical works include A Portrait of an Elderly Man (1513), and The Money Changer and His Wife (1514), all of which provide commentary on human feeling and society in general. He also painted religious altarpieces and triptych panels, the most famous of which was built for the Church of Saint Peter in Leuven.

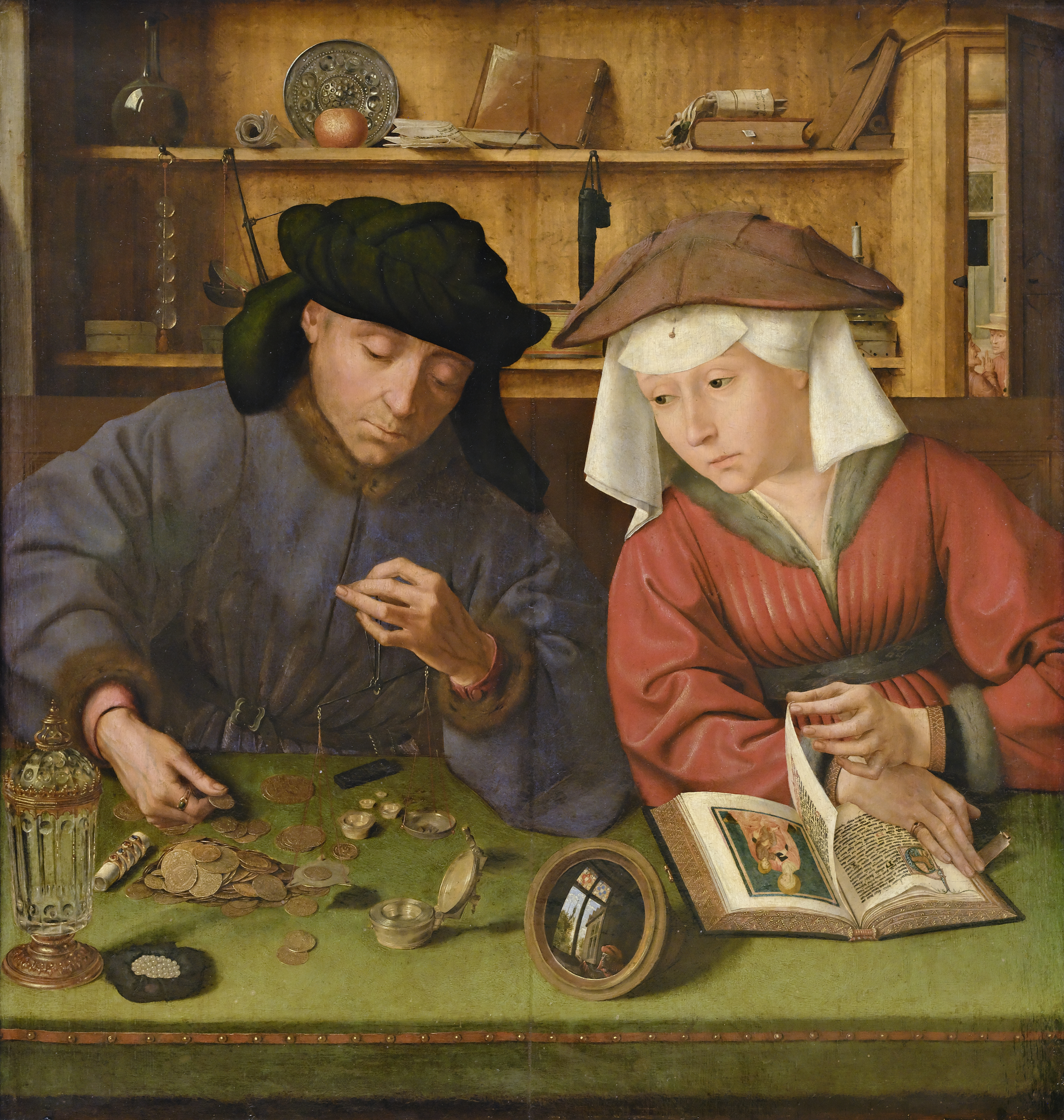
The Money Changer and His Wife (1514) Oil on panel, 71 × 68 cm Louvre Abu Dhabi

Matsys work is considered to contain strong religious feeling—characteristic of traditional Flemish works—and is accompanied by a realism that often favored the grotesque. Matsys' firmness of outline, clear modelling and thorough finish of detail stem from Van Der Weyden's influence; from the Van Eycks and Memling by way of Dirck Bouts, the glowing richness of transparent pigments. Matsys' works generally reflect earnestness in expression, minutely detailed renderings, and subdued effects in light and shade. Like most Flemish artists of the time he paid a great deal of attention to jewelry, edging of garments, and ornamentation in general.

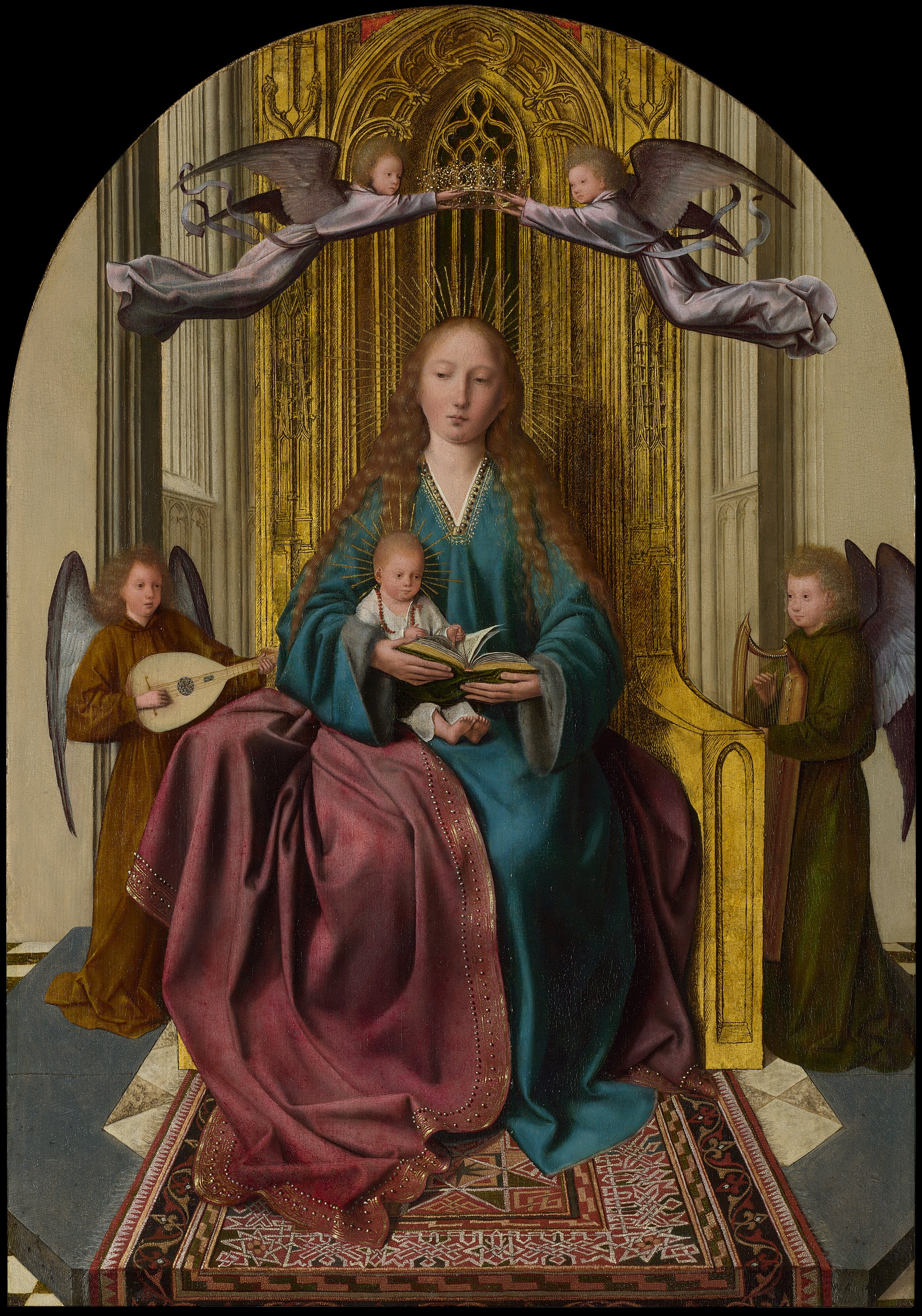
The Virgin and Child Enthroned, with Four Angels (1513) Oil on panel, 62.2 × 43.2 cm National Gallery, London

Most of the emphasis in his works lies not upon atmosphere, which is in fact given very little attention, but to the literalness of caricature: emphasizing the melancholy refinement of saints, the brutal gestures and grimaces of gaolers and executioners. Strenuous effort is devoted to the expression of individual character. A satirical tendency may be seen in the pictures of merchant bankers (Louvre and Windsor), revealing their greed and avarice. His other impulse, dwelling on the feelings of tenderness, may be noted in two replicas of the Virgin and Child at Berlin and Amsterdam, where the ecstatic kiss of the mother seems rather awkward. An expression of acute despair may be seen in a Lucretia in the museum at Vienna. The remarkable glow of the colour in these works, however, makes the Mannerist exaggerations palatable.

Matsys had considerable skill as a portrait painter. His Ægidius (Peter Gilles) which drew from Thomas More a eulogy in Latin verse, is but one of many, to which one may add the portrait of Maximilian of Austria in the gallery in Amsterdam. In this branch of his practice, Matsys was greatly influenced by his fellow countryman Jan Mabuse. Matsys' portraiture exhibits highly personal and individual emotional characteristics that reflect his adherence to realism as a technique.

== Influences ==
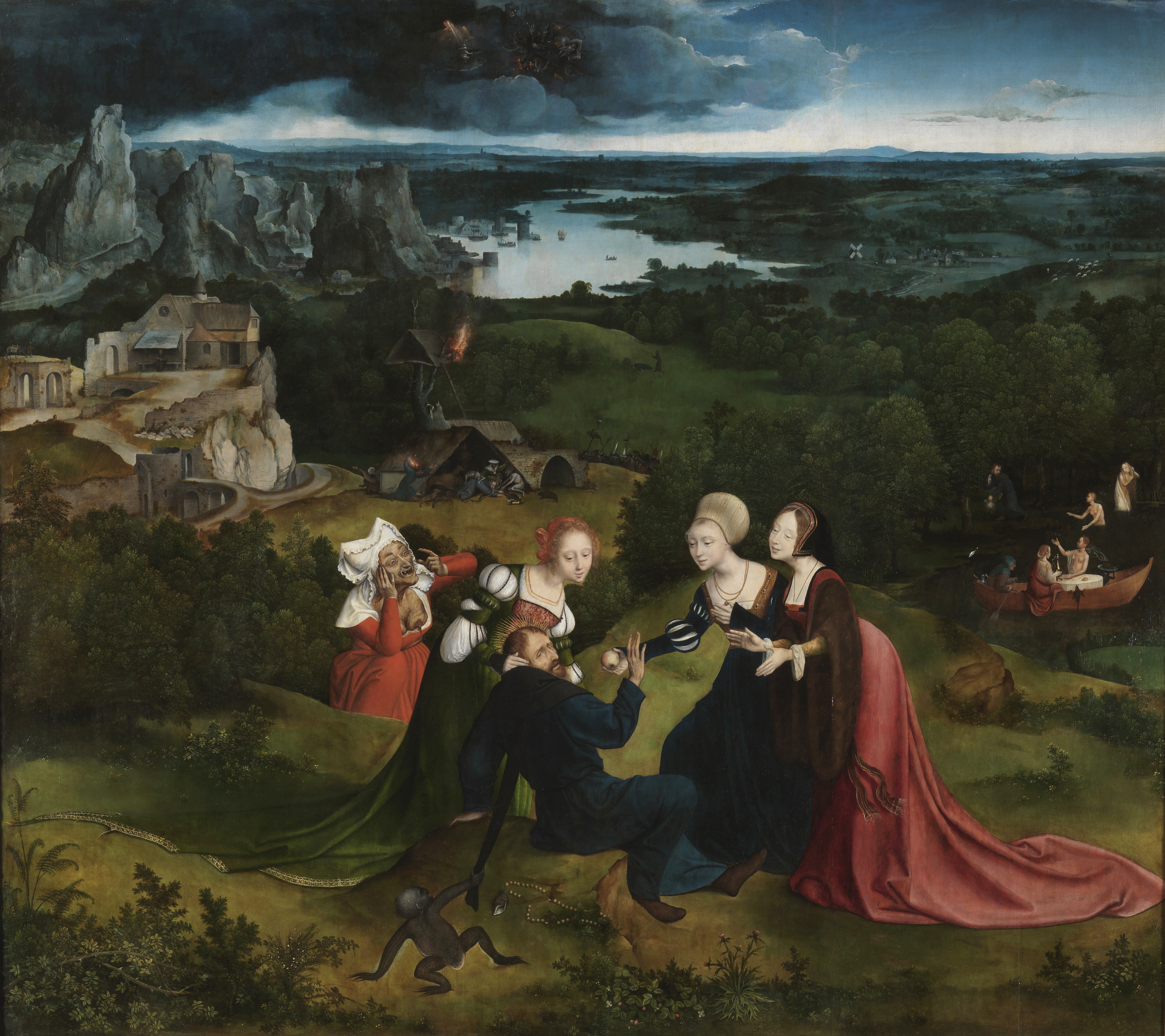
Temptation of St. Anthony, Joachim Patinir and Quentin Matsys, 1520–1524. Prado Museum, Madrid

In comparison to other Northern Renaissance artists such as Holbein and Dürer, Matsys shies away from refined and subtle detailing. Because there are numerous connections between him and these masters, however, it can be concluded that his departure in techniques was deliberate and not an act of ignorance. He most likely met Holbein more than once on his way to England, and Dürer is believed to have visited his house at Antwerp in 1520. Matsys also became the guardian of Joachim Patinir's children after the death of that painter.

His Virgin and Christ, Ecce Homo and Mater Dolorosa (London and Antwerp) are known for their serene and dignified mastery, gaining in delicacy and nuance in the works of his maturity. It is believed that he had known the work of Leonardo da Vinci in the form of prints made and circulated among northern artists (his Madonna and Child with the Lamb, inspired by The Virgin and Child with St. Anne, reflects da Vinci's influences). This is largely regarded as proof that Matsys was greatly influenced by Italian Renaissance artists, and that he most likely travelled to Italy for at least a brief period.

== Death ==
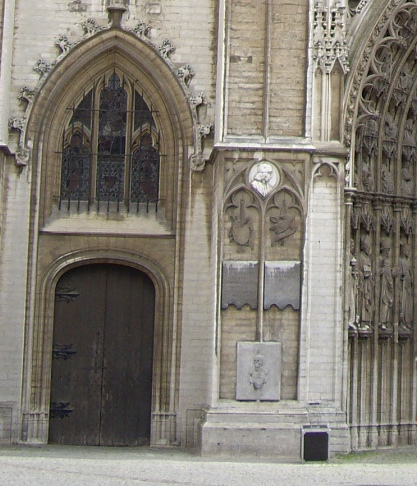
Memorial on Antwerp Cathedral. The artist Luc Tuymans created a modern mosaic at the Museum aan de Stroom based on this skull plaque.

Matsys died at Antwerp in 1530. He was a religious devotee, despite several of his relatives dying as a result of their faith. His sister Catherine and her husband suffered at Leuven in 1543 for what was then the capital offence of reading the Bible: he being decapitated, she allegedly buried alive in the square before the church. In 1629 the first centennial of Matsys' death was marked by a ceremony and erection of a relief plaque with an accompanying inscription on the facade of Antwerp Cathedral. Benefactor Cornelius van der Geest is said to be responsible for the wording, stating: "in his time a smith and afterwards a famous painter", keeping in accordance with the legends surrounding Matsys' humble beginnings.

== Legacy ==
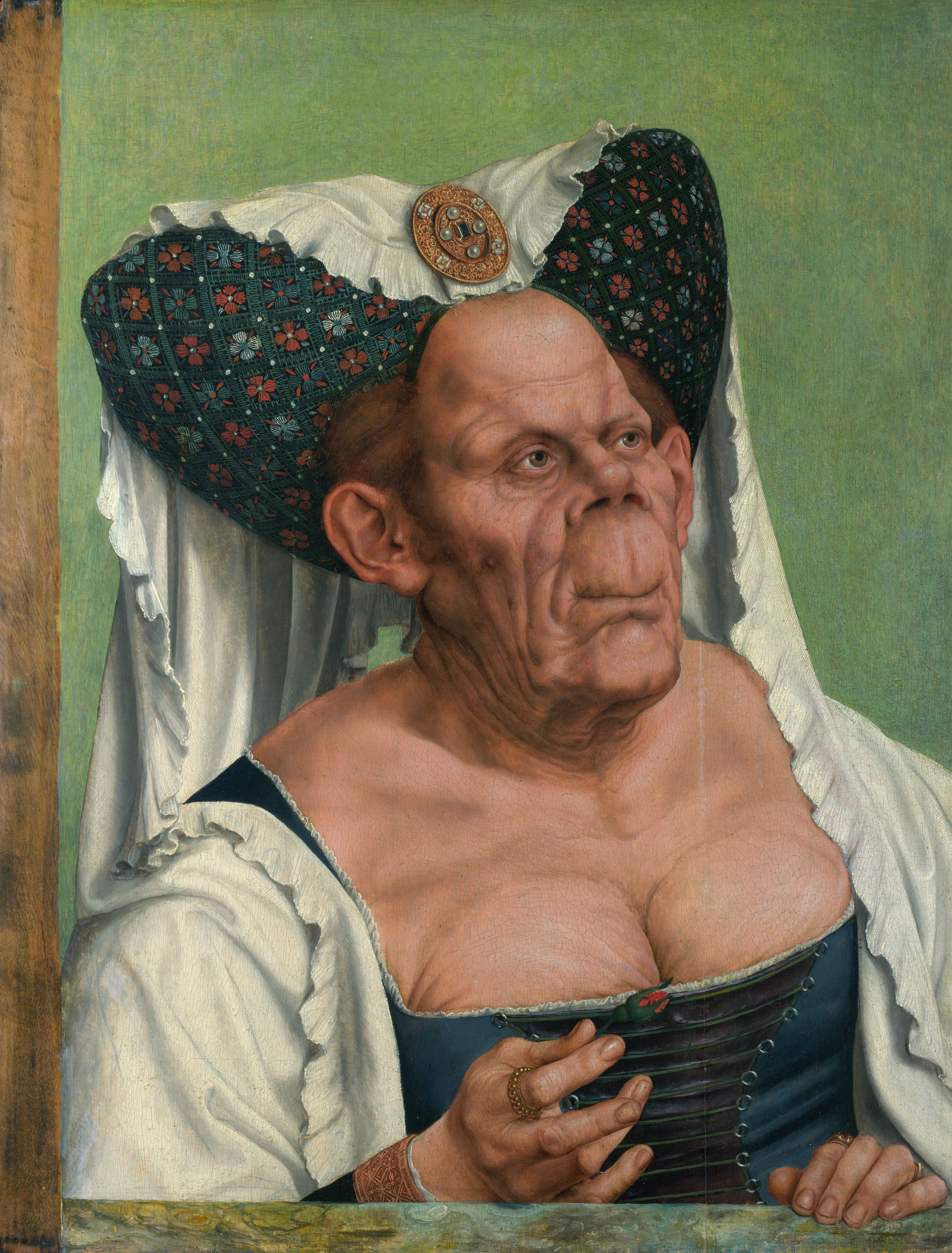
A Grotesque Old Woman Oil on wood, 64 × 45,5 cm National Gallery, London

Matsys' works include A Portrait of an Elderly Man (1513), Christ presented to the People (1518–1520) (Prado), and A Grotesque Old Woman (or The Ugly Duchess), which is perhaps the best-known of his works. It served as a basis for John Tenniel's depiction of the Duchess in Alice's Adventures in Wonderland. It is likely a depiction of a real person with Paget's disease, though it is sometimes said to be a metaphorical portrait of the Margaret, Countess of Tyrol, who was known as Maultasch, which, though literally translated "satchel mouth", was used to mean "ugly woman" or "whore" (because of her marital scandals). His two large triptych altarpieces The Holy Kinship or Saint Anne Altarpiece (1507–1509) and The Entombment of the Lord (1508–1511) are also highly celebrated. Commissioned for the Church of Saint Peter in Leuven, they reflect strong religious feeling and precise detailing characteristic to the majority of his works.

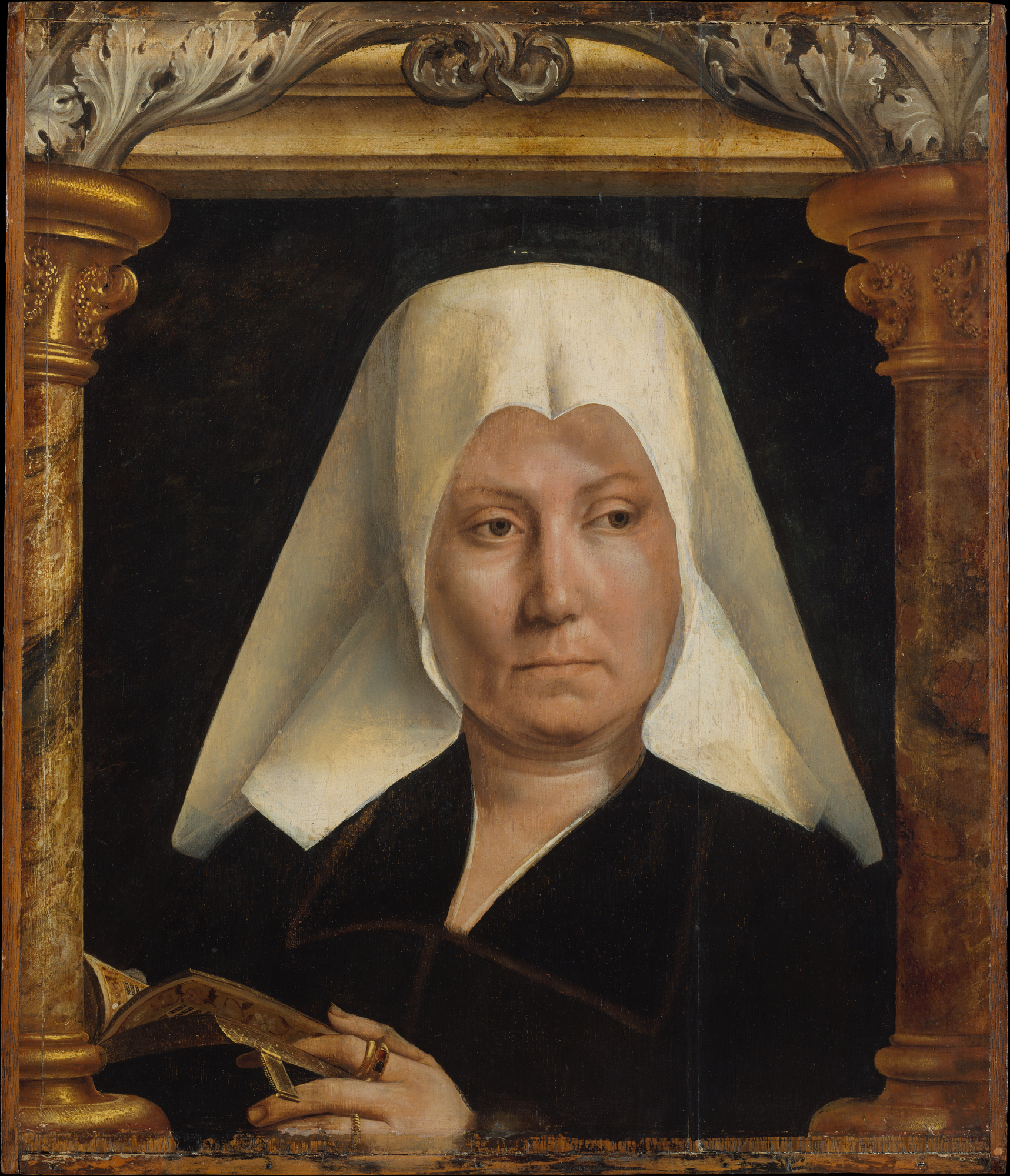
Portrait of a woman, 1520

Matsys also painted part of the altarpiece of the Convento da Madre de Deus, in Lisbon. The altar is a primitive invocation of the Seven Sorrows of Mary, with boards still evocative of "Our Lady of Sorrows","Jesus among the Doctors", "on the path to Calvary", "Calvary", "Lamentation" (all at the Museu Nacional de Arte Antiga) and "Flight into Egypt" (Worcester Art Museum). Since the convent was founded by D. Leonor, Queen Dowager of King John II of Portugal and sister of King Manuel of Portugal, in 1509, it appeared that the order of this set has been performed once, with some authors (Firedlander) pointing as the date of making the frames years prior to 1511. His Christ as the Man of Sorrows is in the J. Paul Getty Museum in Los Angeles.

Quentin's son, Jan Matsys, inherited the art but did not seek to expand upon his father's legacy. The earliest of his works, a St Jerome dated 1537, in the gallery of Vienna, as well as the latest, a Healing of Tobias of 1564, in the museum of Antwerp, are evidence of his tendency to substitute imitation for originality. Another son, Cornelis Matsys, was also a painter. Jan's son, Quentin Metsys the Younger, was an artist of the Tudor court, and painted the Sieve Portrait of Elizabeth I of England.

Near the front of the Cathedral of Our Lady in Antwerp is a wrought-iron well, known as the "Matsys Well", which according to tradition was made by the painter-to-be.

Matsys was a cult figure during the 17th century in Antwerp in addition to being one of the founders of the local school of painting (which climaxed with the career of Peter Paul Rubens).

A penny serial by the British author Pierce Egan the Younger entitled Quintin Matsys was published in 1839.

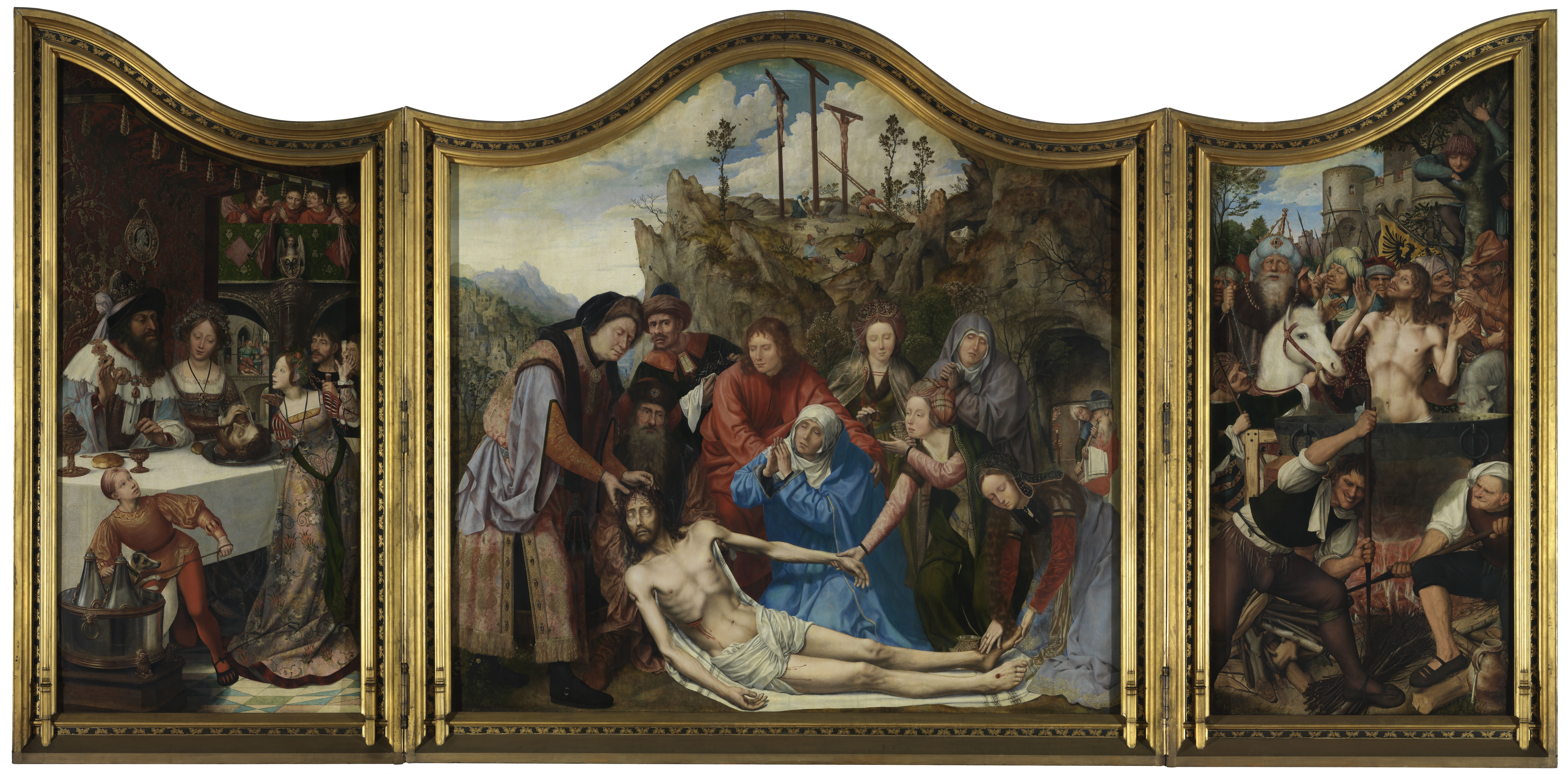
Altarpiece of the carpenters guild, Quinten Massijs, (1511), Royal Museum of Fine Arts Antwerp, 245-248

Joiners' Guild Altarpiece, c. 1511

== See also ==
- Ill-Matched Marriage

== Sources ==
- Herbermann, Charles, ed. (1913). "Quentin Massys" . Catholic Encyclopedia. New York: Robert Appleton Company.
- Works related to "Quinten Massys". Century Magazine at Wikisource
- Works related to Art in the Netherlands "Chapter IV" at Wikisource
