= Cornelis Massijs =

Flemish Renaissance painter, draughtsman and engraver

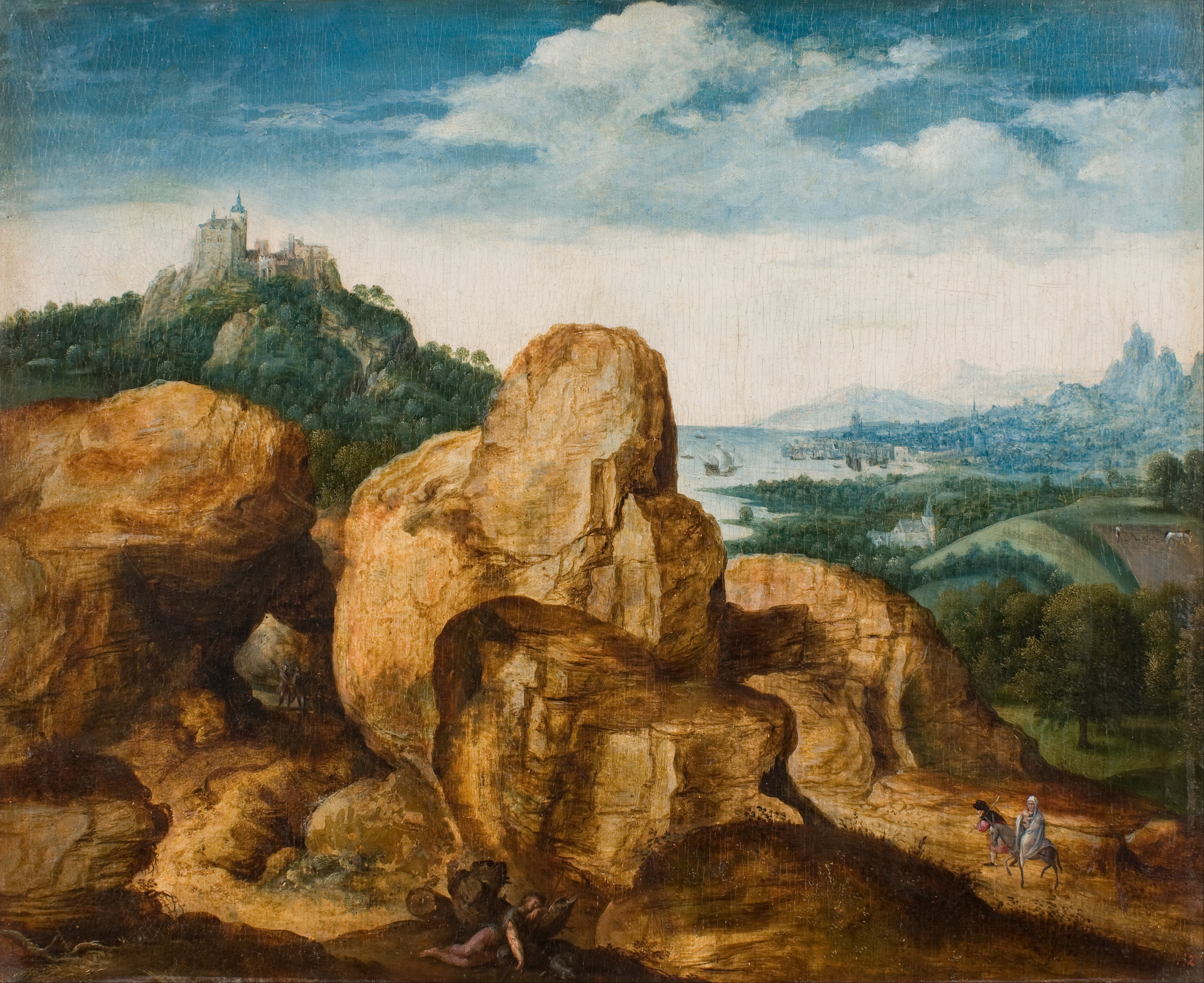
Landscape with the Flight to Egypt

Cornelis Massijs (1508, Antwerp – c. 1556, unknown), was a Flemish Renaissance painter, draughtsman and engraver, mainly known for his landscapes and, to a lesser extent, genre scenes and portraits. He is regarded as an important figure in the transition from the fantastic landscapes of Joachim Patinir to the 'pure landscapes' of later Netherlandish landscape painting.

== Life ==
He was the son of leading Antwerp painter Quinten Matsys and the younger brother of Jan, who also became a prominent painter. He trained under his father. He was admitted together with his brother Jan, as a master in the Antwerp Guild of St. Luke in 1531, a year after his father's death.

In 1544 the brothers were forced to leave Antwerp because of their religious beliefs. Where Cornelis went and whether he ever returned to Antwerp is unknown. There is speculation that Cornelis travelled to England and later to Germany and Italy, but there is no conclusive proof for this.

== Work ==
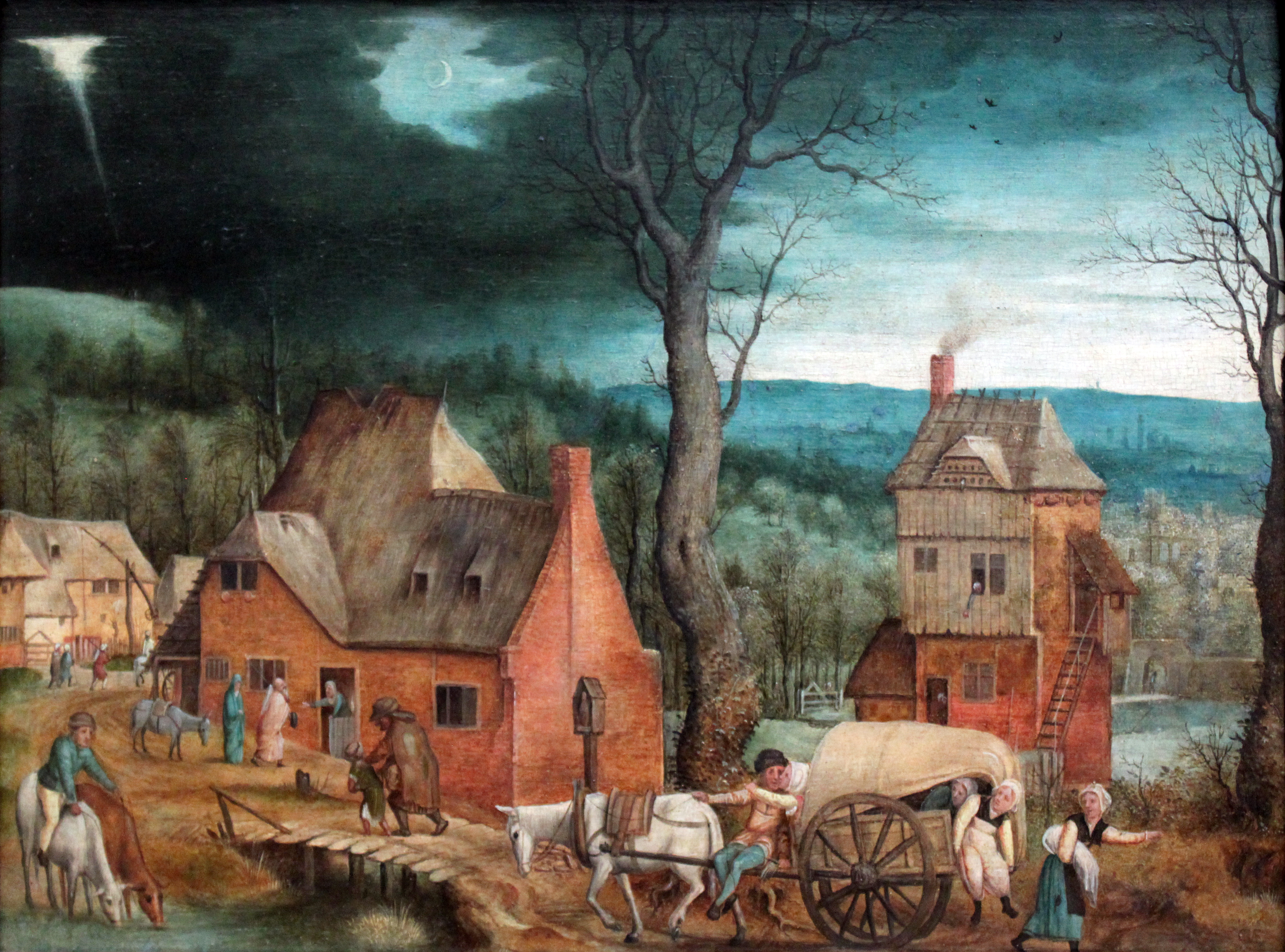
Arrival of the Holy Family in Bethlehem

Cornelis Massijs was initially known for his graphic work. In the early 20th century he was rediscovered as a landscape painter. Seven signed paintings by him are known and these have served as the basis for the attribution of other, unsigned paintings to Cornelis Massijs.

Throughout his career he used three different monograms to sign his work. The monogram COR. MET, which he used from 1537 to 1539, is found on one panel, the Return of the Prodigal Son, dated 1538. This painting shows Cornelis to be an accomplished painter of fantastic landscapes in the style of Joachim Patinir, but a little stiff in the execution and with clumsy figures. During this early period he learned the art of engraving. He copied some of the Italian masters such as Marcantonio Raimondi and Parmigianino and also showed an interest in the German Little Masters in his series the Dancing Cripples of 1538.

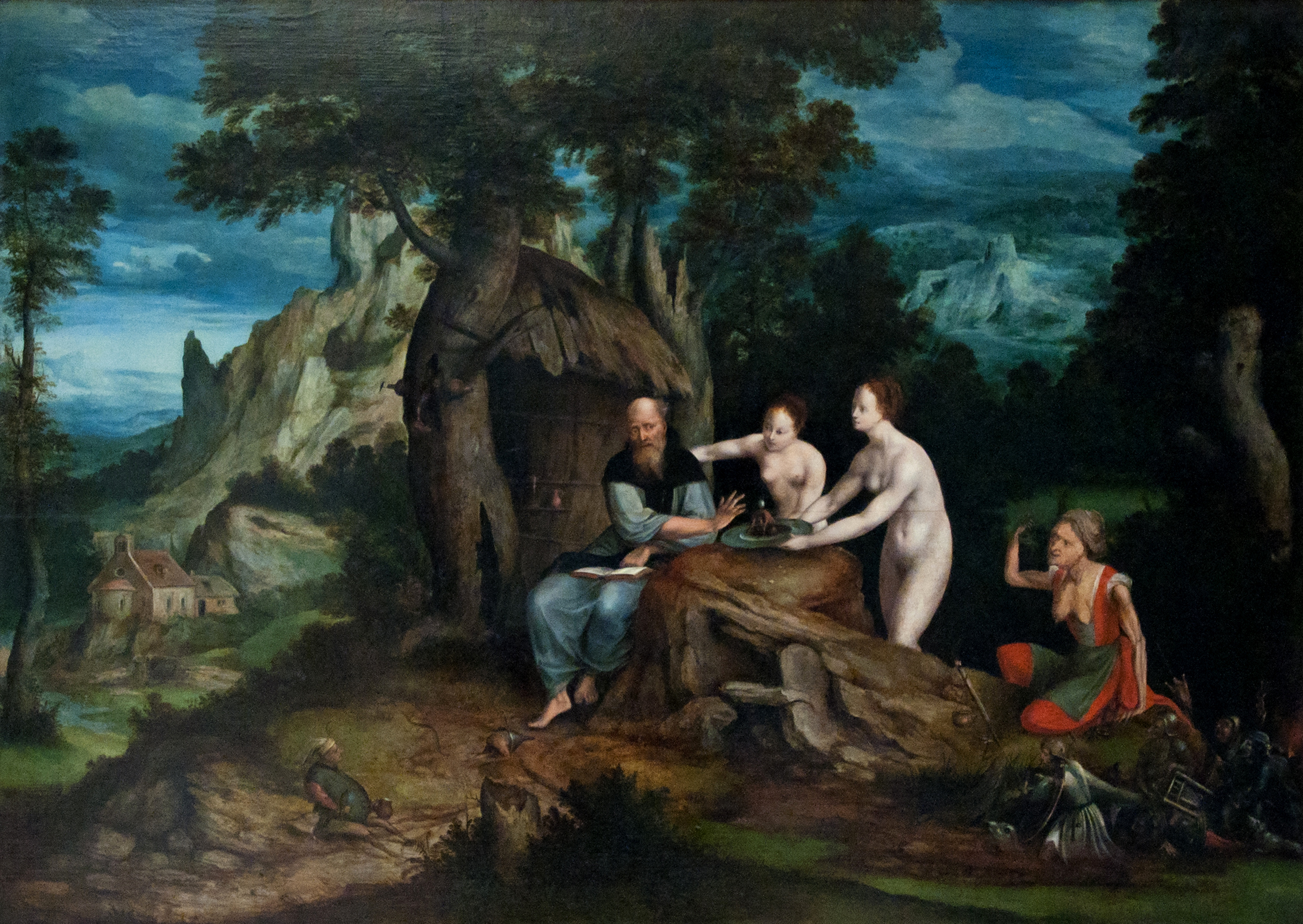
The Temptation of St Anthony

Cornelis used his second monogram CME from 1539 to 1543. During this period he moved away from the fantastic landscapes to a more naturalistic approach. This is demonstrated in his painting the Arrival of the Holy Family in Bethlehem of 1543. During this time he also produced some landscape drawings that pioneer a realistic treatment of landscape detail that was new to northern art. Their rejection of narrative in favour of landscape elements introduces a move towards the depiction of pure landscapes. His later output was all in this more naturalistic vein and he used soft colours which created a sense of intimacy. The paintings from his later career are more panoramic and skilfully integrate landscape and figures.

Upon his exile Cornelis Massys adopted his third monogram CMA. A number of signed paintings from this period are known, only two of which are dated. He also produced engravings of biblical stories and genre scenes with a moralising intent. His Four Blind Peasants was a source of inspiration for the famous painting of The Blind Leading the Blind by Pieter Bruegel the Elder of 1568.

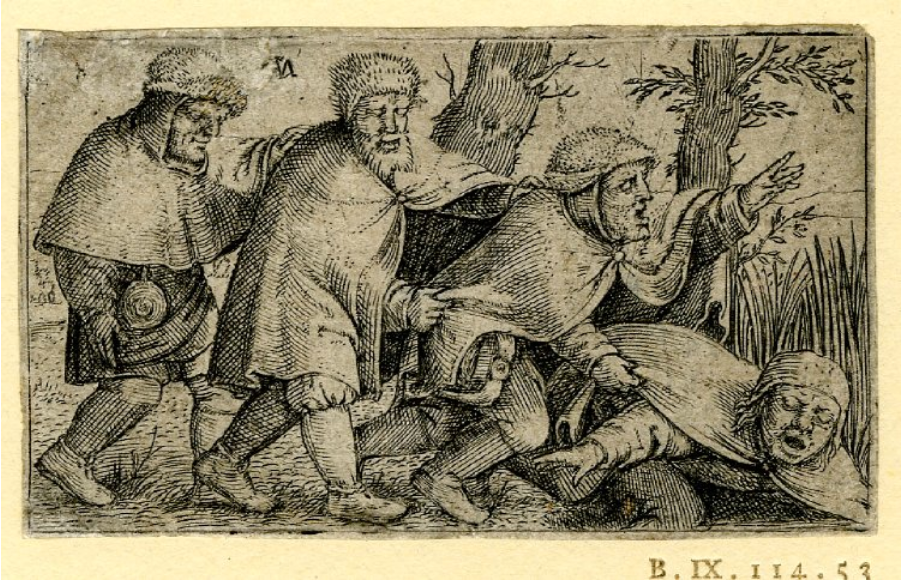
Four Blind Peasants

About 150 engravings by Cornelis Massys are known. His graphic work introduced a wide range of religious and moralizing themes into Northern art. His engravings show an attention to the line rather than the overall effect.

Cornelis Massijs was also known for his drawings of grotesques and ornamental designs. He made a few portraits, among them his engravings of Peter Ernst I von Mansfeld-Vorderort and his wife and of Henry VIII engraved in 1544 and printed in 1548, which are the main reasons why it is assumed Cornelis spent time in Germany and England.
