= Jan Matsys =

Flemish Renaissance painter (c. 1510–1575)

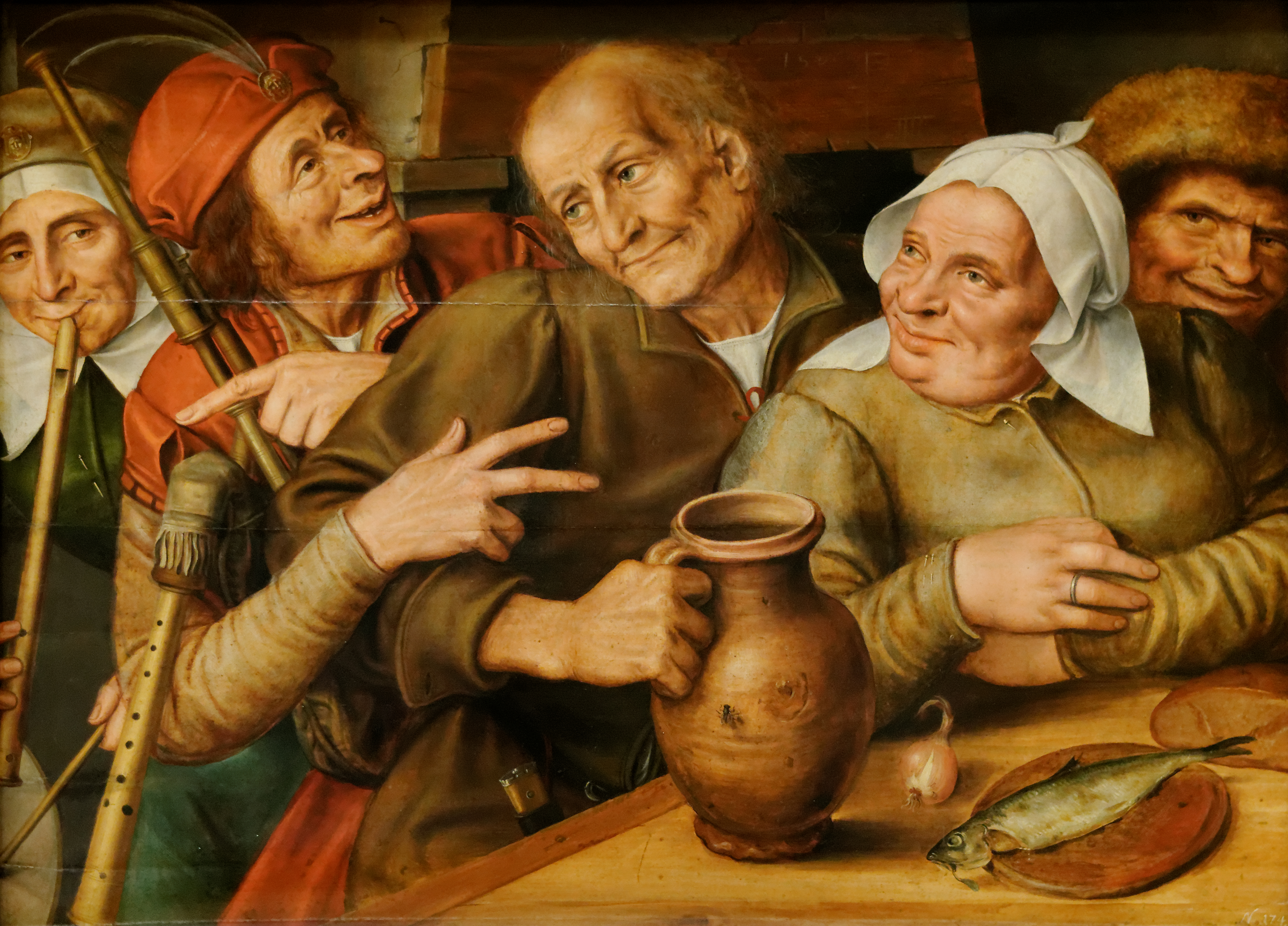
A merry company

Jan Matsys or Jan Massijs (c.1510 – 8 October 1575) was a Flemish Renaissance painter known for his history paintings, genre scenes and landscapes. He also gained a reputation as a painter of the female nude, which he painted with a sensuality reminiscent of the school of Fontainebleau.

== Life ==
He was born in Antwerp, the son of leading Antwerp painter Quinten Matsys and the older brother of Cornelis, who became a painter and engraver. He trained under his father. He was admitted, together with his brother Cornelis, as a master in the Antwerp Guild of St. Luke in 1531, a year after their father's death. It is assumed that he left Antwerp immediately thereafter and worked for a while in Fontainebleau, but these facts are not firmly established. He was back in Antwerp by 1536. He married his cousin Anna van Tuylt in 1538. The couple had three children.

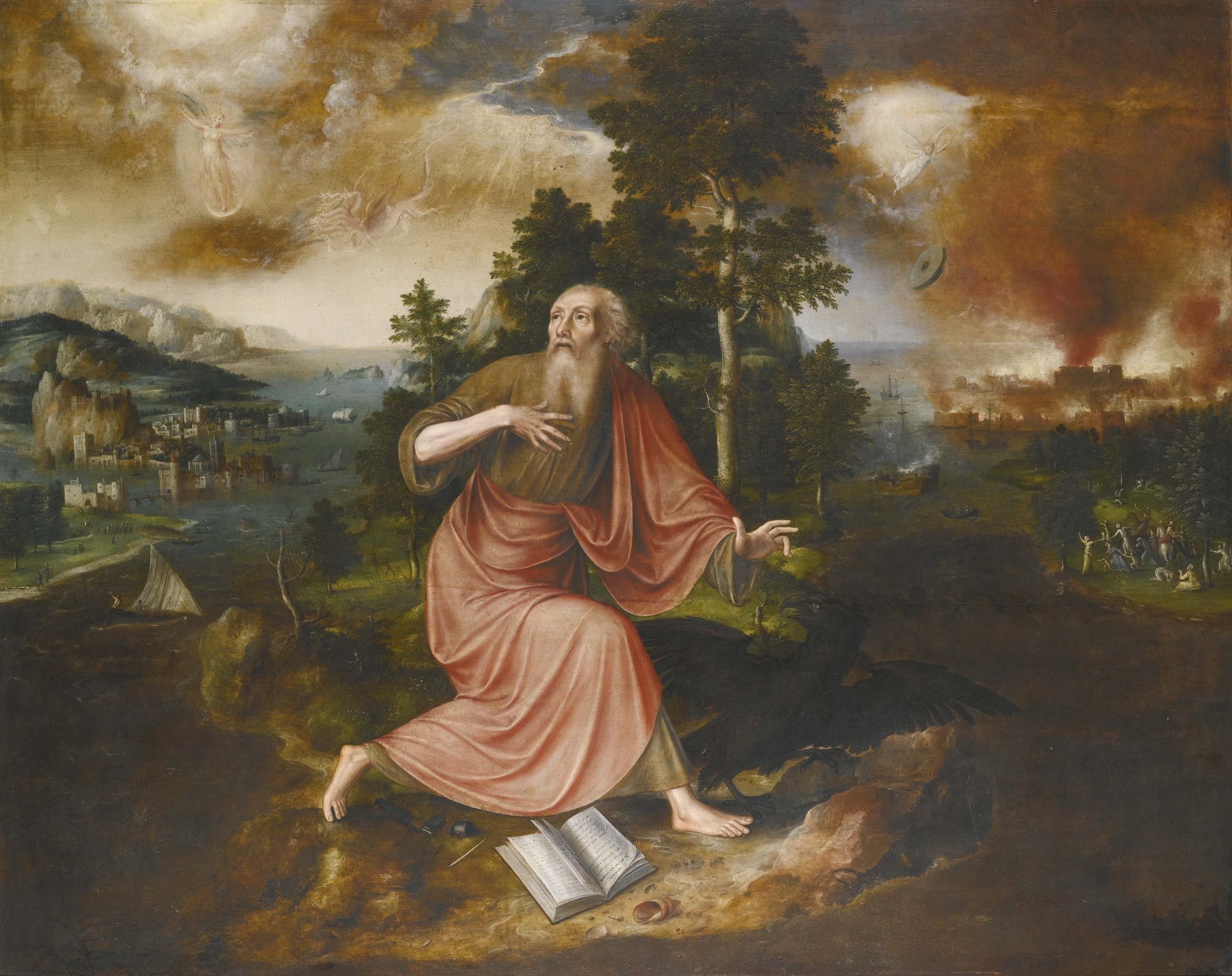
The Apocalypse of Saint John the Evangelist, (1563)

In 1544 Jan and his brother Cornelis were banned from Antwerp because of their religious beliefs. It is possible that Jan went to Fontainebleau and Germany. It is certain that he spent time in Genoa. He returned to Antwerp before the end of 1555 when the ban imposed on him was ended. He was then involved in a number of court cases with his brothers and sisters over the distribution of inheritances.

He had been sufficiently rehabilitated for the local city council to commission several works from him. These works were destroyed in 1576 when Spanish troops set the city hall on fire during the Spanish Fury and the Sack of Antwerp. Jan Matsys had died the year before, in Antwerp, having been reduced to a state bordering on poverty. His son Quentin had become a master of the Guild of St. Luke in 1574 and died in Frankfurt in 1589. Jan's daughter Susan emigrated to Italy. It is assumed that Jan's children left Antwerp for religious reasons.

His known pupils are Frans van Tuylt (in 1536), Frans de Witte (in 1543) and Olivier de Cuyper (in 1569).

== Work ==
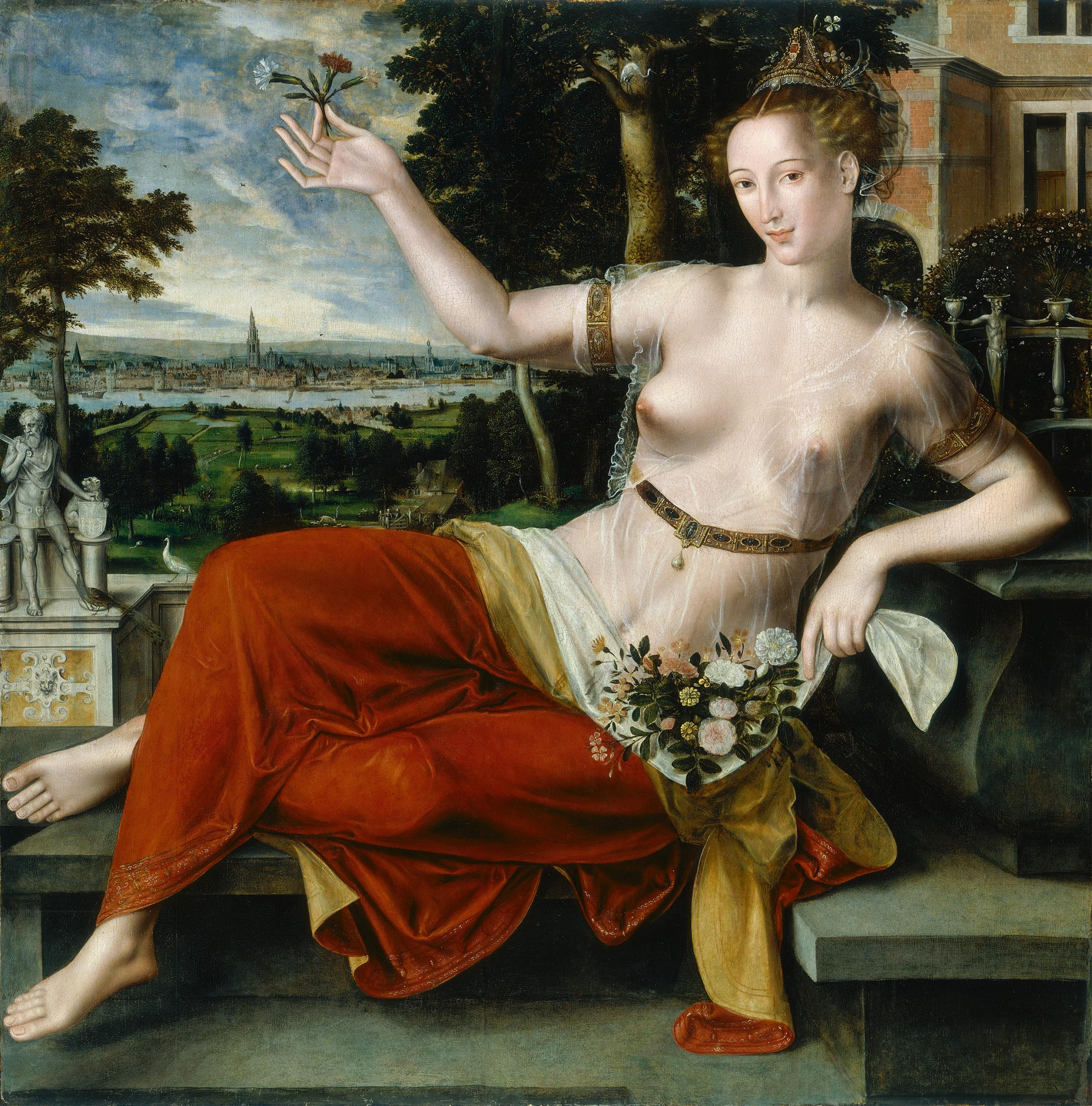
Flora, 1559, Hamburger Kunsthalle

It is possible to distinguish three periods in the work of Jan Massys. During the first period before his exile of 1544, he collaborated with and worked in the style of his father. He also completed some works left unfinished at the time of his father's death. The first dated painting from this time is a St. Jerome in his cell of 1537, which is completely in his father's style.

From the second period, which coincides with his banishment from Antwerp from 1544 to 1555, only 9 works can be traced. These works seem to show the influence of the School of Fontainebleau. It remains unclear whether Jan Matsys actually went to Fontainebleau or underwent this influence in an indirect manner. During his stay in Italy he painted a portrait of Andrea Doria, which is one of the few instances that he painted portraits. Only two works from this period bear a signature and a date, both from 1552.

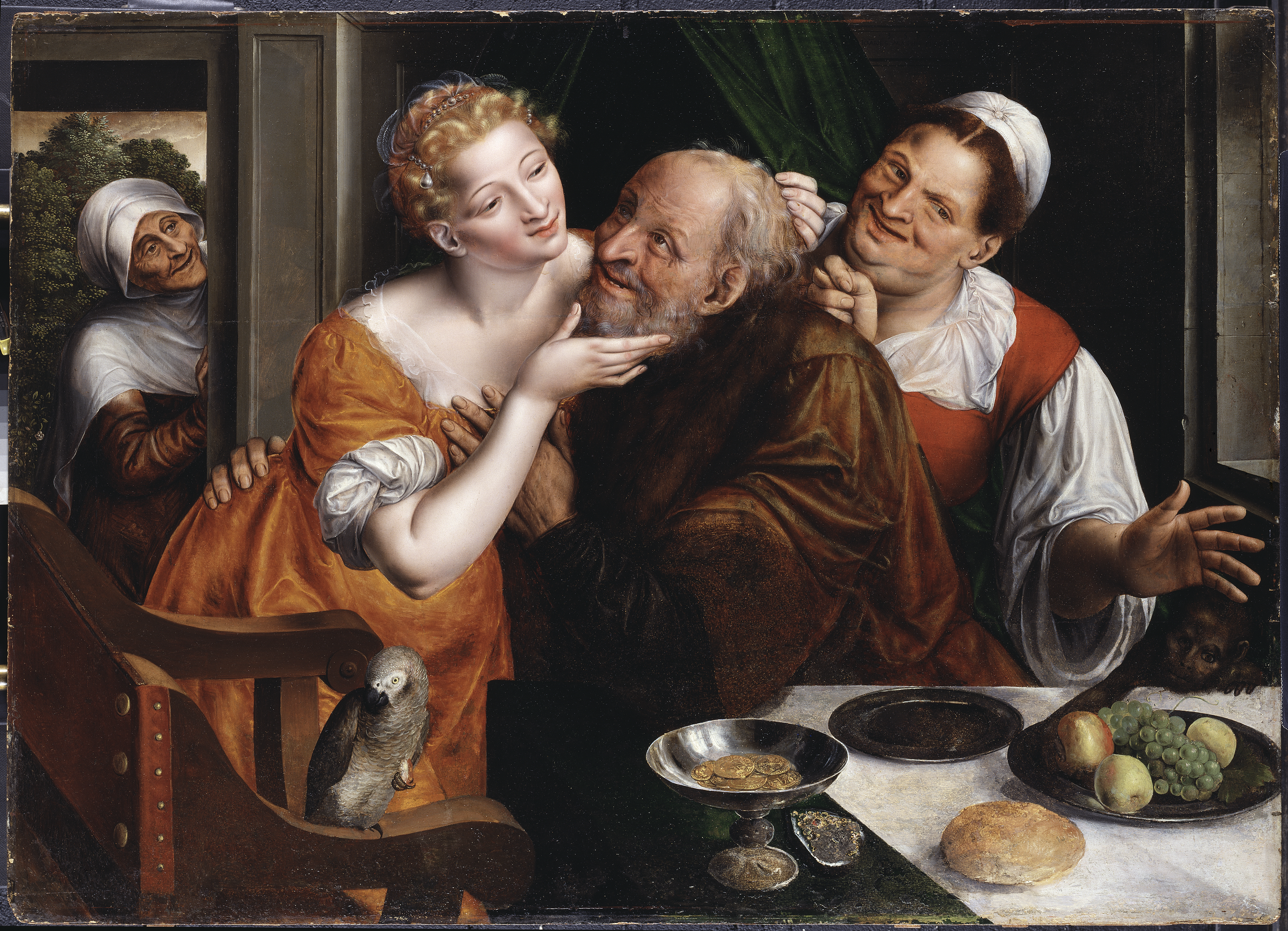
The Ill-matched Pair, 1566

After his return to Antwerp Jan reached the height of his artistic powers. He developed a distinct style and treated a number of subjects that became characteristic for his work. Remarkable is the important role that the female nude and eroticism play in his work. He frequently used Old Testament figures such as Judith, Susanna, Bathsheba and the daughters of Lot as an excuse to depict the female nude. The sensuality of these figures is reminiscent of the works of the School of Fontainebleau. The principal male characters he depicted were Tobias and Elias.

Jan Matsys is sometimes regarded as one of the pioneers in Netherlandish art of certain secular subjects such as 'unequal love' (depicting a couple of widely different ages) and 'merry companies'. In these paintings temptation and purchased love always seem to play the main role. Other subjects he pioneered were the money changer, tax collector and the miser, although others see his father as the creator of this genre. These works are considered to have carried a moralizing purpose.

Jan Matsys also painted a number of landscapes but his work in this genre is not as significant as that of his brother Cornelis.
