= Quentin Metsys the Younger =

Flemish painter

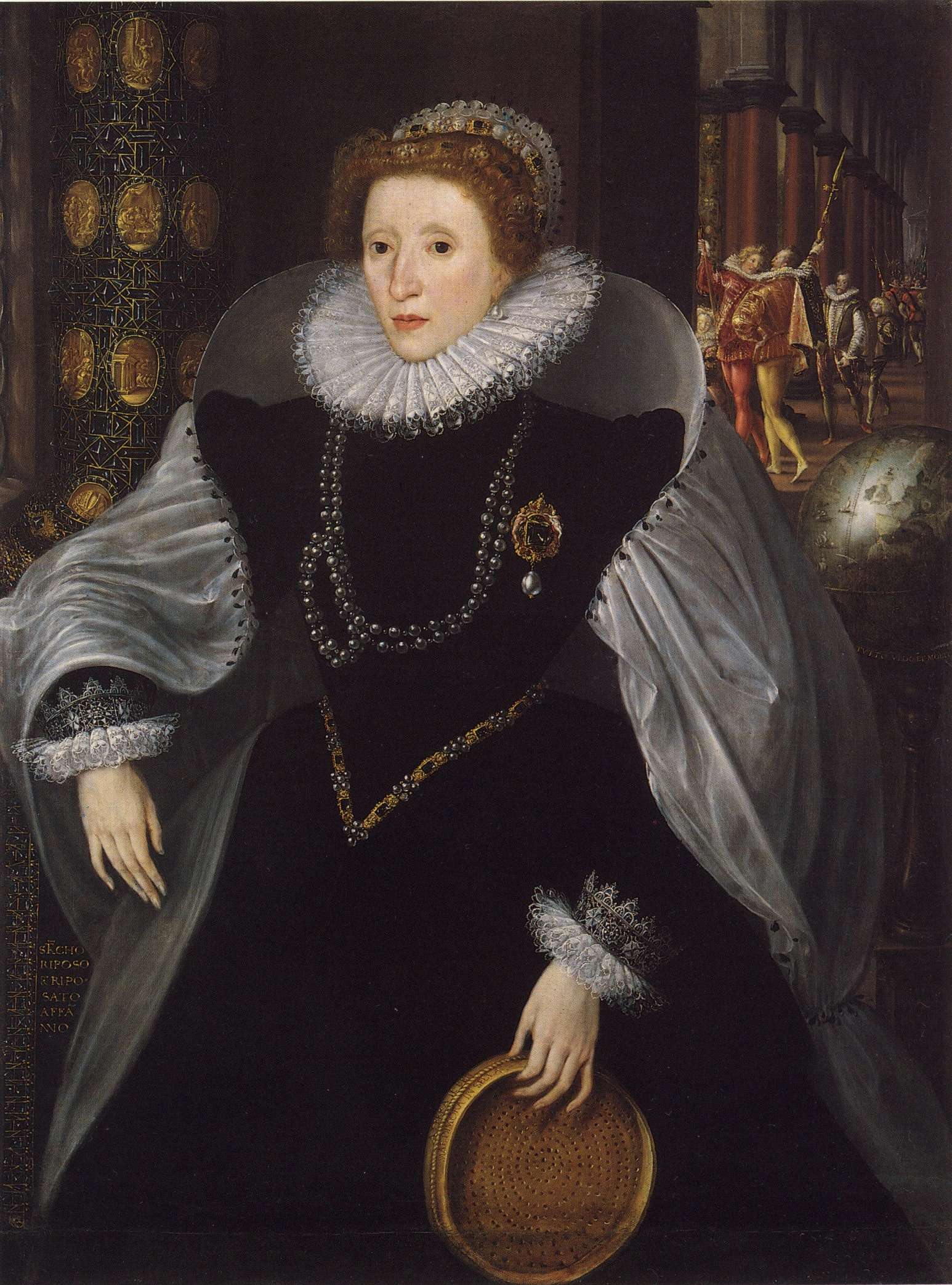
The Sieve Portrait of Elizabeth I by Quentin Metsys the Younger, c. 1583

Quentin Metsys the Younger (Quinten or Massys; c. 1543 – 1589) was a Flemish Renaissance painter, one of several of his countrymen active as artists of the Tudor court in the reign of Elizabeth I of England. He was the son of Flemish painter Jan Massys, Matsys, or Metsys and the grandson and namesake of Quentin Massys or Metsys.

The younger Quentin was born in Antwerp, where he joined the Guild of St. Luke in 1574; by c. 1581 he was living in London, likely having fled religious persecution in Antwerp as his father and uncle had done. He left England for Frankfurt in 1588 and died there the next year.

He is best known for the Sieve Portrait of Elizabeth I, commissioned by Christopher Hatton in 1583, in which she is depicted as Tuccia, a Vestal Virgin who proved her chastity by carrying water from the Tiber River to the Temple of Vesta without spilling a drop. Elizabeth is surrounded by symbols of empire, including a column and a globe, iconography that would appear again and again in her portraiture of the 1580s and 1590s, most notably in the Armada Portrait of 1588.
