= Appelmans =

Appelmans As appelman was a name for a fruit dealer, the surname could have an occupational origin. It may refer to:

- Gerard Appelmans, 13th-century mystic
- Jan Appelmans (1352–1411), Flemish architect
- Pieter Appelmans (1373–1434), Flemish architect, father of the above
- Sabine Appelmans (born 1972), Belgian tennis player

== See also ==
- Appelman
