= Cornelis Verdonck =

Flemish composer

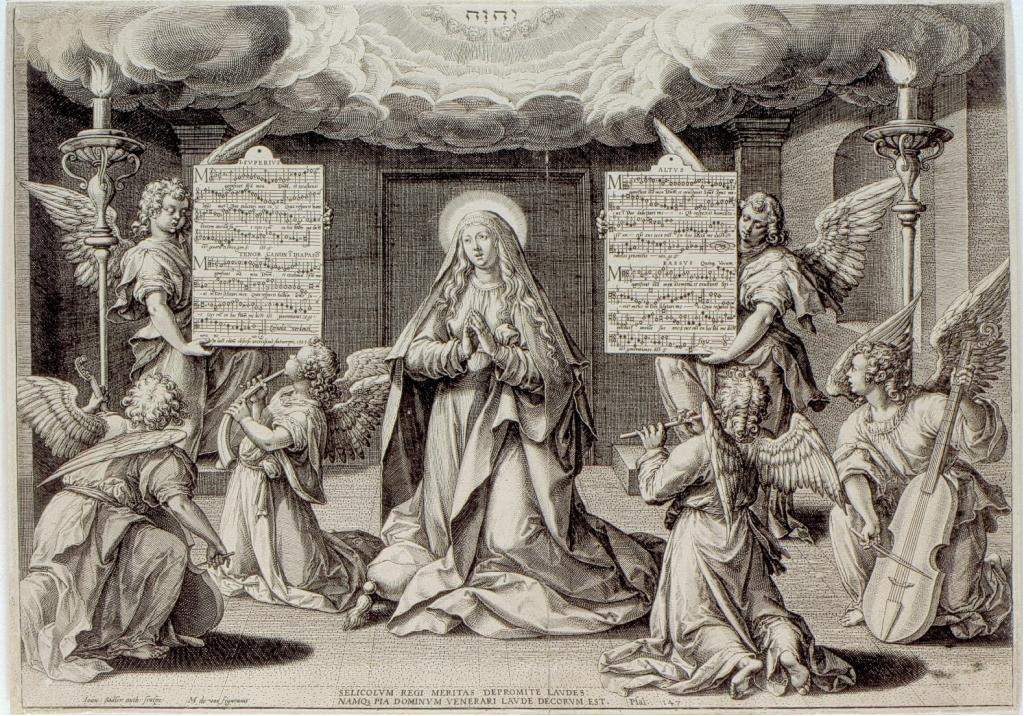
Engraving from 1585 showing, among other things, two angels carrying plates with a musical composition by Verdonck

Cornelis Verdonck (1563 – 5 July 1625) was a Flemish composer of the late Renaissance. He was one of the last members of the Franco-Flemish school of polyphony, and was a notable composer of madrigals in a style that blended both Italian and native Netherlandish idioms.

== Life ==
Verdonck was born in Turnhout. From his earliest years, he was in the household of Cornelis Pruenen, senator and treasurer of Antwerp; in addition he was a choirboy at Antwerp Cathedral until about the age of 9. In 1572 he went to Spain to be part of the choir of Philip II in Madrid, where he stayed until his voice broke in early 1580, at which time he returned to the Netherlands to study in Antwerp with Séverin Cornet, and possibly with Hubert Waelrant as well. His earliest works, published along with those of Cornet, date from this period.

In 1584 Verdonck returned to Spain, once again singing in the choir of Philip II, staying there until 1598 or 1599, after which he again returned to Antwerp. Also in 1599 he participated in the elaborate entry procession of the newly married Archduke Albert and Archduchess Isabella into Antwerp, writing a motet (Prome, novas) for the occasion: it was performed by a six-member boys' choir mounted on the back of an elephant, which rode along with the Archduke and Archduchess (accounts differ as to whether it was a real or artificial animal). It is the only known motet composed for performance on an elephant.

Most likely Verdonck remained in the Netherlands until his death in 1625. He held a prebend at Eindhoven until 1622, and seems to have been in the service of wealthy burghers for all of his life except for his sojourn in Spain. One of his employers was Johannes Carolus de Cordes, the nephew of his original patron, as evidenced by the dedication of a book of madrigals Verdonck published in 1603.

== Music and influence ==
Verdonck was a late representative of the Italian madrigal style in northern Europe, and was unusual in that he wrote madrigals in Italian without ever going to Italy. Stylistically he was relatively conservative, shunning the innovations of the early Baroque around 1600, including monody and the basso continuo, preferring instead to work in the polyphonic vocal style of the late 16th century. In the preface to a 1599 collection of madrigals, he wrote scathingly of the decline of musical standards in his native land, which had once been the musical center of Europe: "whether these sweet harmonies have been interrupted by the tempests of Mars, who has too long been master of these provinces, or whether music has ceased to be esteemed by those who, filled with confusion ..., cannot value what is full of agreement and harmony."

Most of Verdonck's surviving output consists of secular music, and he wrote both French chansons and Italian madrigals. Some of the chansons are for unusually large groups of voices (for example, his publication Poésies françaises de divers autheurs mises en musique par C. Verdonck of 1599 is for 10 independent voices), and the texture of his music is mostly contrapuntal, with sometimes lively syncopation. One of his madrigals, Donna belle e gentile, fitted with English words (as "Lady your look so gentle"), appeared in the 1588 Musica transalpina collection by Nicholas Yonge which inaugurated the madrigal vogue in England.

Verdonck also wrote sacred music; his output includes several motets and a Magnificat, which are scored for four, five, or six voices. The Magnificat (1585, for five voices) survives in the original copper engraving.

== References and further reading ==
- Lenaerts, R. B.; Forney, Kristine. L. Macy (ed.). Cornelis Verdonck. Grove Music Online. (subscription required)
- R. B. Lenaerts: Cornelis Verdonck, The New Grove Dictionary of Music and Musicians, ed. Stanley Sadie. 20 vol. London, Macmillan Publishers Ltd., 1980. ISBN 1-56159-174-2
- Gustave Reese, Music in the Renaissance. New York, W.W. Norton & Co., 1954. ISBN 0-393-09530-4
