= Saint Francis of Assisi at Prayer =

Painting by Bartolomé Esteban Murillo

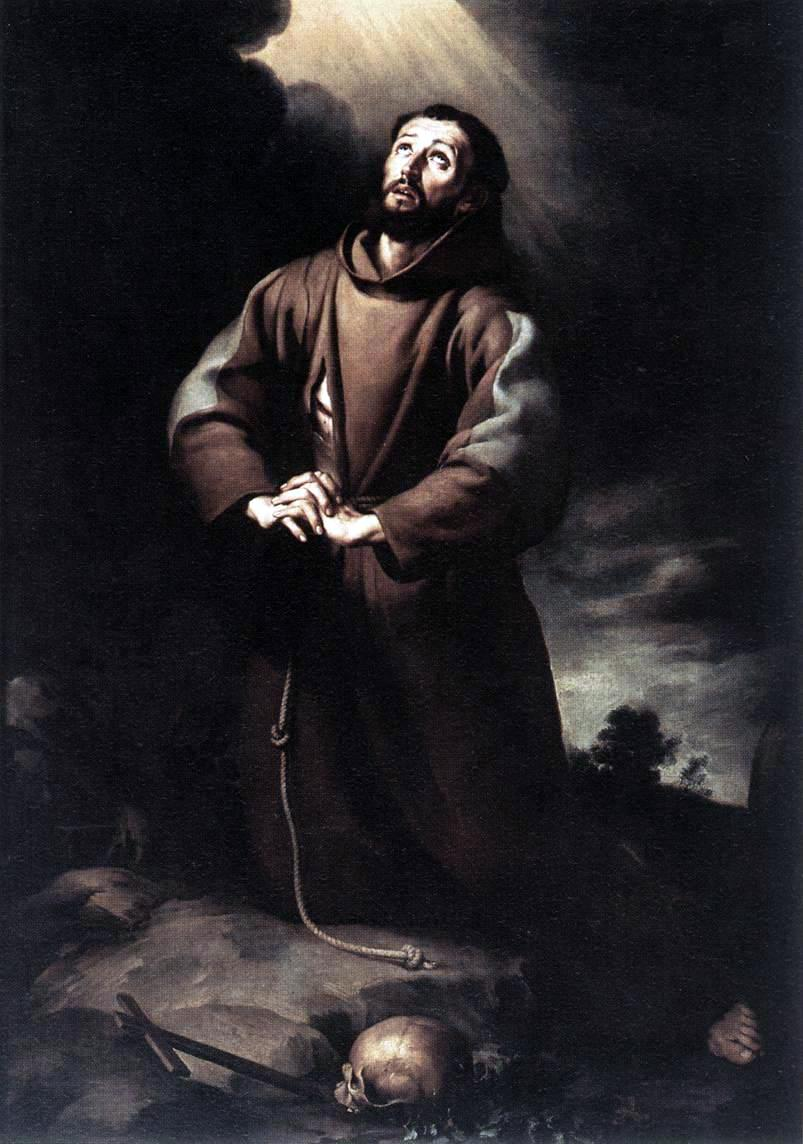
- Artist: Bartolomé Esteban Murillo
- Year: c. 1645-1650
- Medium: Oil on canvas
- Dimensions: 182 cm × 130 cm (72 in × 51 in)
- Location: Antwerp Cathedral, Antwerp

Saint Francis of Assisi at Prayer is an oil on canvas painting by Spanish artist Bartolomé Esteban Murillo, created in c. 1645–1650, now in the Antwerp Cathedral.

== Description ==
The artist presents Saint Francis of Assisi, the founder of the Franciscans, in prayer, he is kneeled with folded hands, on a rock. The cross and the skull are two elements typical of Francis of Assisi's iconography.

The mystical contact with God is presented by the light that emanates from the sky. The scene was presented in the convention of a cloudy evening. Francis is wearing the Franciscan brown habit with a hood, patched with large pieces of lighter cloth. The monastic dress is tied with a white rope, as is the custom of Franciscans. The saint has the signs of the stigmatization, the hands and the tearing of the habit on the left side allow to see the wounds.
