= Hubert Waelrant =

Flemish composer, singer, teacher, music editor, bookseller, printer and publisher

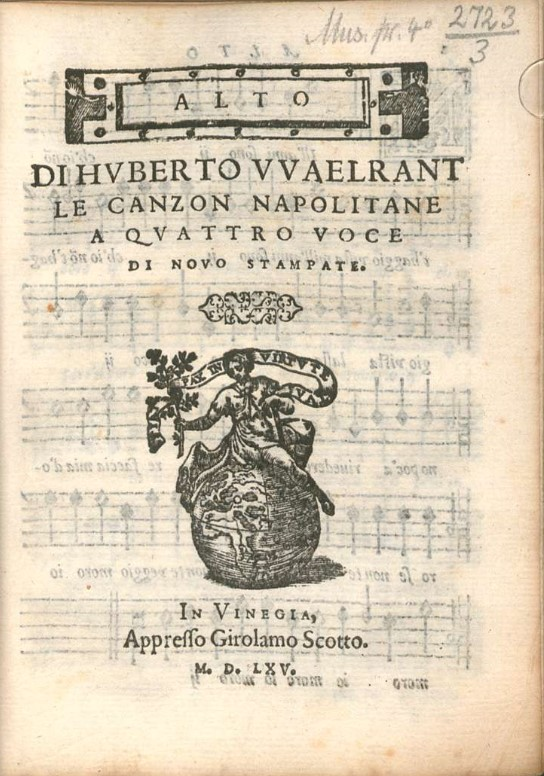
Title page of the 'Di Hvberto Vvaelrant le canzon napolitane a qvattro voce' by Hubert Waelrant, published by Girolamo Scotto in Venice in 1565

Hubert Waelrant or Hubertus Waelrant (last name also spelled Waelrand and Latinised name: Hubertus Waelrandus) (c. 1517 – 19 November 1595) was a Flemish composer, singer, teacher, music editor, bookseller, printer and publisher active in 16th century Antwerp. He was a member of the generation of the Franco-Flemish School of composers who were contemporaries of Palestrina. Unlike famous composers of his time he mostly worked in northern Europe. His style is a transition between that of Nicolas Gombert and the mature Orlande de Lassus. His compositions were modern in their use of chromaticism and dissonance.

== Life ==
Details of Waelrant's roots are uncertain, but he may have been one of a family of lawyers from Antwerp, the city in which he spent most of his life. Since some of his children were also lawyers it is seen as likely that he was related to this family.

As a young man he may have studied in Italy, a common destination for a talented singer and composer from the Netherlands in the 16th century. While there is no documentary evidence for a trip to Italy, Waelrant maintained contact with a wealthy patron there, and his madrigals the influence of some of the more progressive Italian composers of his time. The artist married at least three times: to Maria Loochenborch (c.1547), to Anna Ablyt (or Van Covelen) (28 July 1564) and to Johanna Cleerhaghen on 3 May 1581. He may have been married a fourth time to Maeyken Corecopers on 23 July 1551 (1995, p. 53). He had 10 children with his first wife. Three of his sons, called Raymond, Peter and Paul became organists.

The first definite evidence of his activities is in the archives of the Antwerp cathedral and the St. James' Church in Antwerp, where he was a tenor singer in 1544 and 1545. In the mid-1550s he was active as a teacher of music as well. Waelrant founded a music school in Antwerp. He entered into lease agreements from 1553 to 1556 for operating the music school.

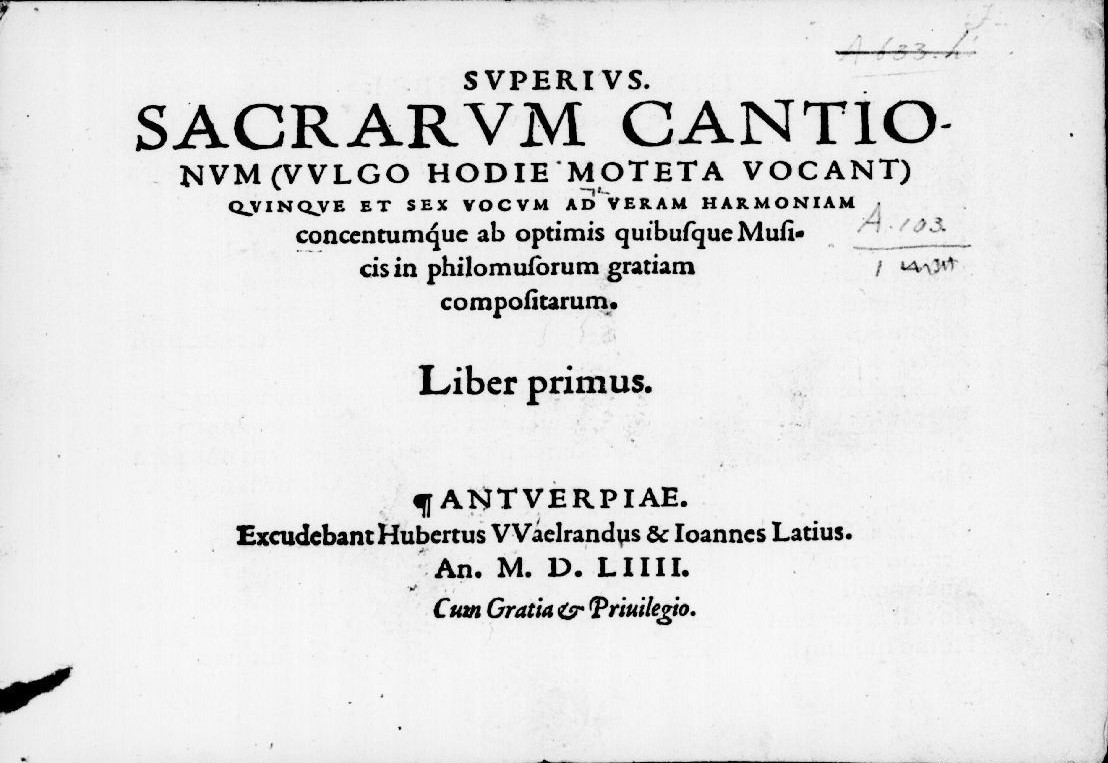
Title page of the 'Sacrarum cantionum' published by Waelrant and de Laet in 1554/1555

According to his pupil Frans Sweerts (Franciscus Sweertius), writing in Athenae belgicae (1628), he was an innovator of solmization for which he devised two new methods. The composer first added si to the six syllables of the hexacord and then repeated ut to make a full octave. He then created a new method with these new syllables. The second invention involved the creation of an octave using eight syllables with new names all different from the existing names of notes. The new names are: BO, CE, DI, Ga, LO, MA, and NI. The innovations were intended to address the problems inherent to the existing Guidonian system which used three overlapping hexacords and the difficulties of mutation.

He began his activities as a publisher in the early 1550s in partnership with Jan de Laet. Waelrant acted as the publisher and bookseller and handled the financial and sales aspects of the operation while de Laet took care of everything to do with the printing. Waelrant may also have become involved occasionally with the printing side of the enterprise as he called himself a 'typographus' in two books. The printing and publishing partnership eventually produced 16 publications.

His adherence to the Roman Catholic faith has been a matter of dispute. Evidence in his music suggests that he may have had Protestant sympathies, and indeed may have been an Anabaptist, although legal documents show him to have been a Catholic. It was a turbulent time of religious conflict—one of the reasons many local composers went to Italy and other countries—and Waelrant may have been deliberately unclear as to his beliefs; Antwerp changed hands several times during his life, alternately captured by Calvinists and the Catholic Habsburgs, and both sides suffered persecution. Some of Waelrant's simple psalm settings in the vernacular language suggest that he was a Protestant, and there is evidence that they were confiscated by Catholic church authorities at Kortrijk.

Details of his life are sparse after 1558, but he probably remained in Antwerp, where he was active as a composer, consultant for the tuning of cathedral bells, and music editor. He collaborated on a music anthology with several other Flemish composers in 1584, including Cornelis Verdonck and Andreas Pevernage, and the next year he edited a book of Italian madrigals (Symphonia angelica), some of which he wrote himself, which became extraordinarily successful (Italian madrigals were one of the most popular forms of music in Europe in the late 16th century, and composers wrote them, in Italian, even in countries where Italian was not spoken.) At the end of his life he endured financial difficulty. He died in 1595 and was buried in the Onze-Lieve-Vrouwekathedraal (Church of Our Lady, Antwerp).

== Music ==
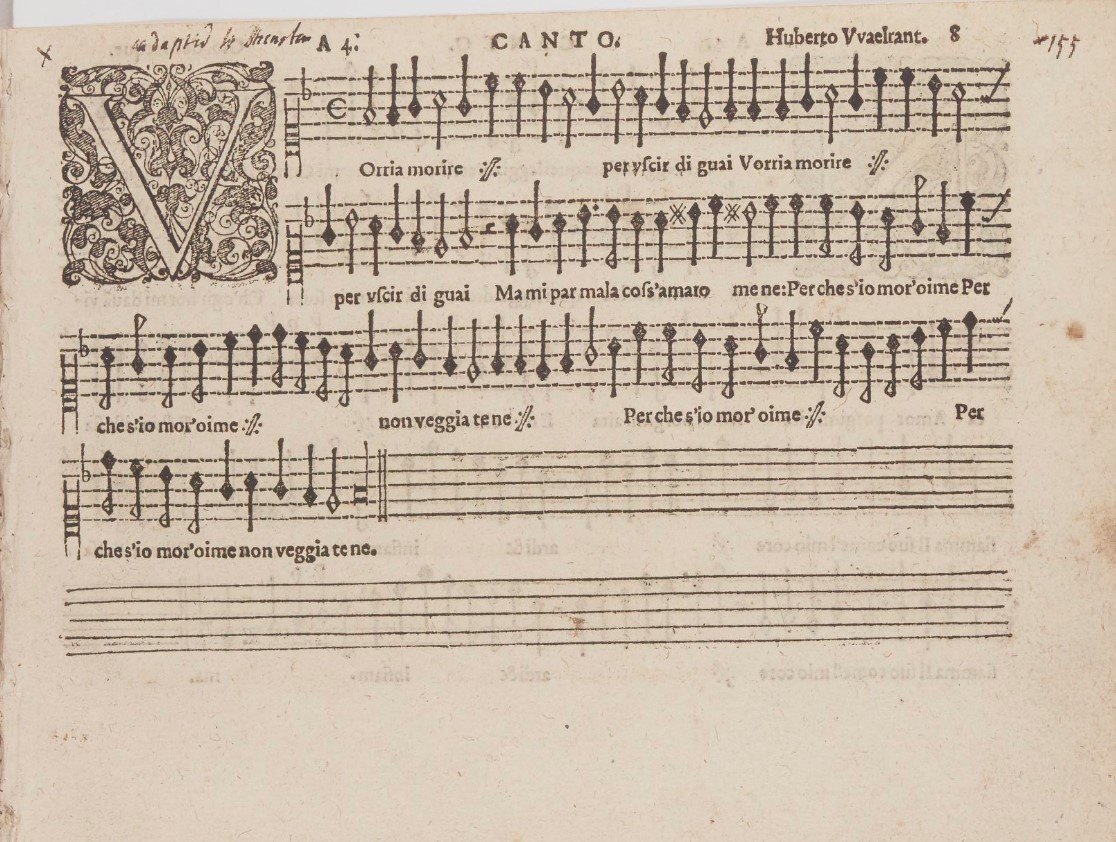
The song 'Vorria morire' by Hubert Waelrant, published by Girolamo Scotto in Venice in 1565

Waelrant wrote sacred and secular vocal music as well as instrumental music. His output included motets, metrical psalm settings, French chansons, Italian madrigals, Italian napolitane (secular songs, of a light character, such as would be sung in Naples), and arrangements of the Italian pieces for instruments such as lute.

His motets are the most progressive part of his output, and are characteristic of the mid-century practice intermediate between the smooth, pervading imitation of composers such as Nicolas Gombert, where all voices where equal, and textural contrast was minimized; and late-century composers such as Lassus. Indeed, many of his motets are reminiscent of Lassus, using chromaticism, cross-relations, textural contrast, and always remaining carefully attentive to the comprehensibility of the text. Waelrant uses text-painting as well, highlighting individual words with characteristic gestures, as a method to increase the expressivity of the music. Occasionally, his use of text-painting is obvious: for example, in his chanson Musiciens qui chantez, after the word "taire" (silent) all the voices rest for a moment of silence.

Harmonically, Waelrant usually preferred voicings that contained complete triads, and with his preference for root motions of fifths over those of thirds, one can hear the impending tonal structures of the Baroque era, which was to begin shortly after his death. In this regard his motets also resembled those of Lassus.

Waelrant's activities as an editor and performer influenced his approach to composition, and his manuscripts are full of helpful shorthand to the performers. He was careful to align notes and syllables, a practice by no means universal in the 16th century, and he used accidentals reliably, rarely leaving the interpretation of half- and whole-steps to the singer.

His settings of secular texts ranged from the light to the serious, and employ an array of contrapuntal devices, a characteristic more of secular music in northern Europe than in Italy. But the language of the settings is Italian for the madrigals and French for the chansons. Most of his music was published in Antwerp, although at least one collection of 30 songs (napolitane) was published in Venice (1565). Waelrant was involved in efforts to compose music for contemporary Dutch-language lyrics. Together with Gregorius Trehou, Cornelis Verdonck and Andreas Pevernage he would have set lyrics of Jan van der Noot's Lofsang van Braband (Hymn to Brabant, Antwerp, Gilles van den Rade, 1580) to music. This work is now lost.
