= Blavier =

Blavier is a surname occurring in Belgium and France. Notable people with the surname include:

- André Blavier (1922–2001), Belgian poet
- André-Joseph Blavier (1713–1782), Flemish musician and composer
- Arthur Blavier (1914–1991), Belgian football referee
