= Portrait of Cornelis van der Geest =

Painting by Anthony van Dyck

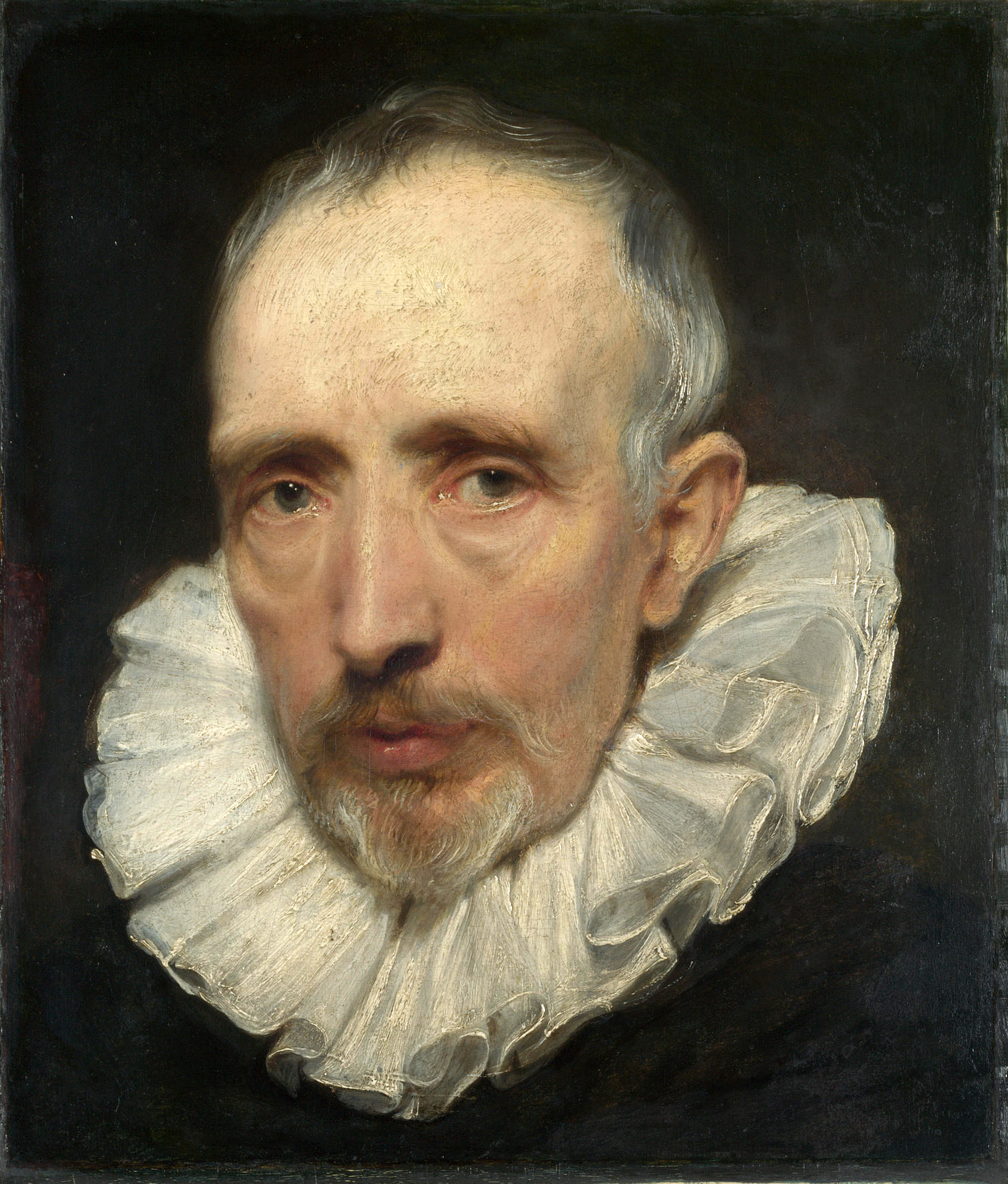
- Portrait of Cornelis van der Geest
- Artist: Anthony van Dyck
- Year: c. 1620
- Medium: Oil on wood
- Subject: Portrait
- Dimensions: 37.5 cm (14.8 in) × 32.5 cm (12.8 in)
- Condition: Restored
- Location: National Gallery, London
- Website: National Gallery

The Portrait of Cornelis van der Geest is a panel painting by Anthony van Dyck from about 1620. The original panel and painting were expanded by other artists. X-rays of the painting revealed the additions. Between 1620 and 1796, the provenance of the painting was not documented. The painting was also cleaned and skinned.

In 1796 the painting was thought to be an image of Flemish diplomat Gaspar Gevartius. In 1864, the painting was purchased by the National Gallery in London as a work attributed to Flemish artist Peter Paul Rubens. The National Gallery later determined that it was a painting of Cornelis van der Geest by van Dyck.

== Background ==
Around 1620, when the portrait was executed, van Dyck was 21 years old, and the subject of the painting, Cornelis van der Geest, was 65. It is one of van Dyck's earliest works but is considered a masterpiece. Van der Geest, a wealthy spice merchant from Antwerp, was an avid art collector and commissioned the painting. He was a prominent figure and patron of the arts.

== History ==
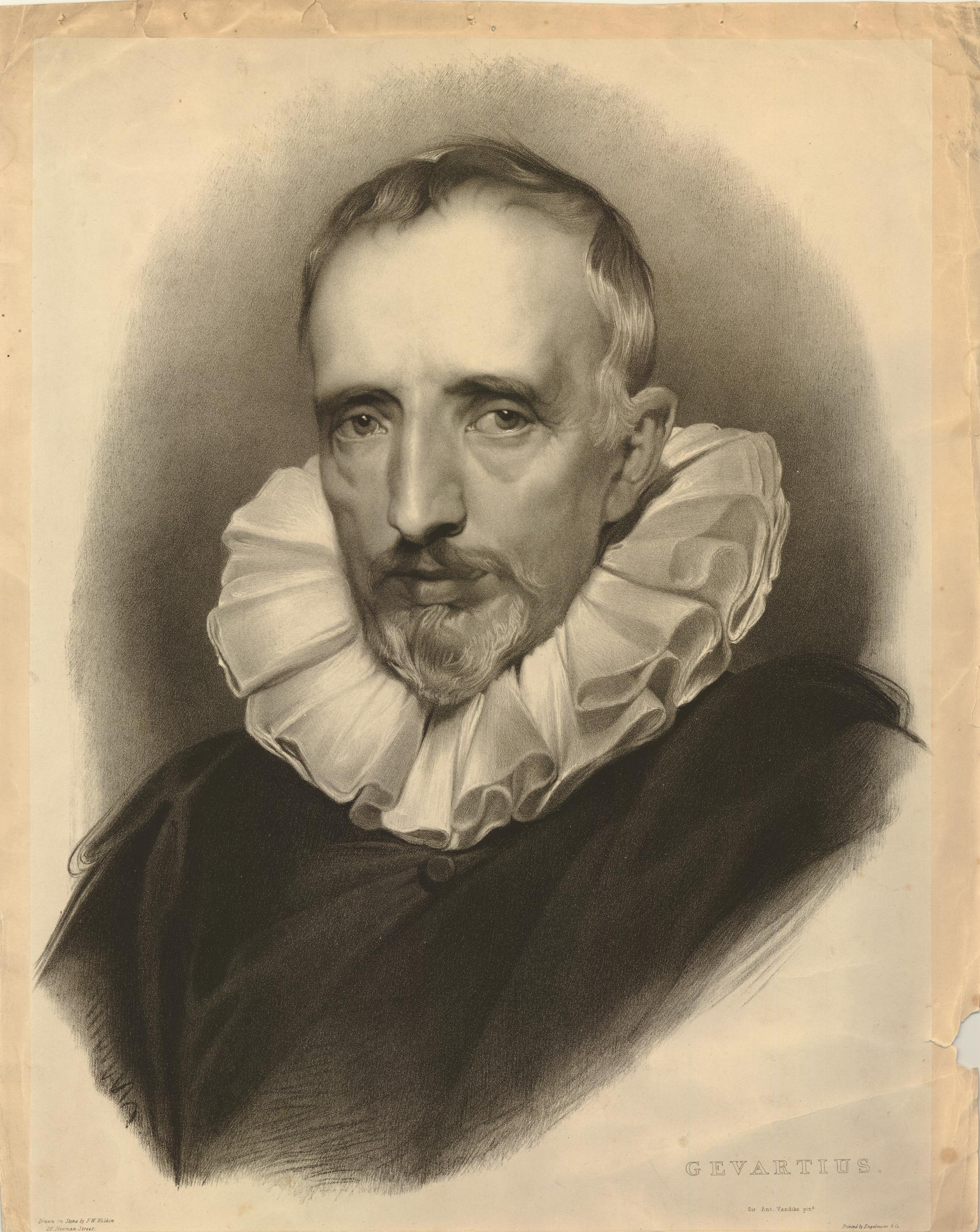
"Gevartius" – a print by Francis William Wilkin

The painting is in the main collection of the National Gallery in London. From 1620 to 1796 its ownership was unknown; the known provenance begins with its sale at an auction in 1796, when it was thought to be an image of Gaspar Gevartius. In 1798 the painting was sold to Julius Angerstein at auction, and at the same auction a copy was sold as well. When Angerstein put the painting on display in 1815 he credited it to Flemish artist Peter Paul Rubens. In 1824 the painting was purchased by the National Gallery, and in 1864 they determined that the person in the image was Cornelis van der Geest and the artist was van Dyck.

In 1948, the National Gallery cleaned and skinned the painting of its glazes. (Note: Skinning refers to the process of cleaning an oil painting by removing a layer from its surface (in this case, the glazing); inevitably, this also removes some of the original paint.) In 1950 it was cleaned again. The National Gallery is certain that the head and collar are the work of van Dyck, but they are uncertain about who painted the rest of the image. The painting is considered a "problem painting", both because the "skinning" may have harmed the original work and because of the large gap in its provenance. The use of X-ray technology has shown that the original painting may have been only the head inside a simulated oval frame, without the dark background. It is also clear that parts of the white ruffled collar were executed by a later artist. More wood was added to the bottom of the original oak-wood oval, probably in the 1630s, to expand the original face-only image to a bust. The National Gallery determined that this addition was not done by van Dyck.

=== Other versions ===
There are many known replicas and copies of this painting by other artists, including some from the 18th and 19th centuries. Two known engravings have also been created from the painting, one by British engraver George Thomas Doo in 1830 that is now stored in the Royal Academy of Arts in London, the other c. 1835 by John Rogers, who titled his engraving "Gevartius"; it is in the collection of the National Museum of American History in Washington, D.C.

== Description ==
The oil on wood painting is 37.5 cm (14.8 in) × 32.5 cm (12.8 in). The National Gallery's description of the painting is effusive; they referred to the brushwork as "virtuosic". The artist used long brushstrokes, and thick paint in some areas. There is the appearance of glistening water in the subject's eyes which was achieved with the use of white paint. The portrait includes only van der Geest's head and shoulders, which allowed the artist to concentrate on the facial features and details of the white ruffled collar. The painting was executed with a single light source in front and above the subject.

== Reception ==
In Steve Holmes's book, Masterworks: Low and Surrounding Countries: Sixteenth to Eighteenth Century Old Master Paintings, Holmes focussed on the artist's skill at painting the eyes. He said Anthony van Dyck captured the eyes of his subject with an "animated brightness". In the book Anthony van Dyck: A Further Study British art historian Lionel Cust describes the painting as "elaborately and carefully constructed, built up and modelled to the extreme point of academic precision".

== See also ==
- List of paintings by Anthony van Dyck
