= André-Joseph Blavier =

Belgian composer

André-Joseph Blavier (baptized 29 December 1713 – 30 November 1782) was a Flemish composer, and director of the choir of Antwerp Cathedral.

== Life ==
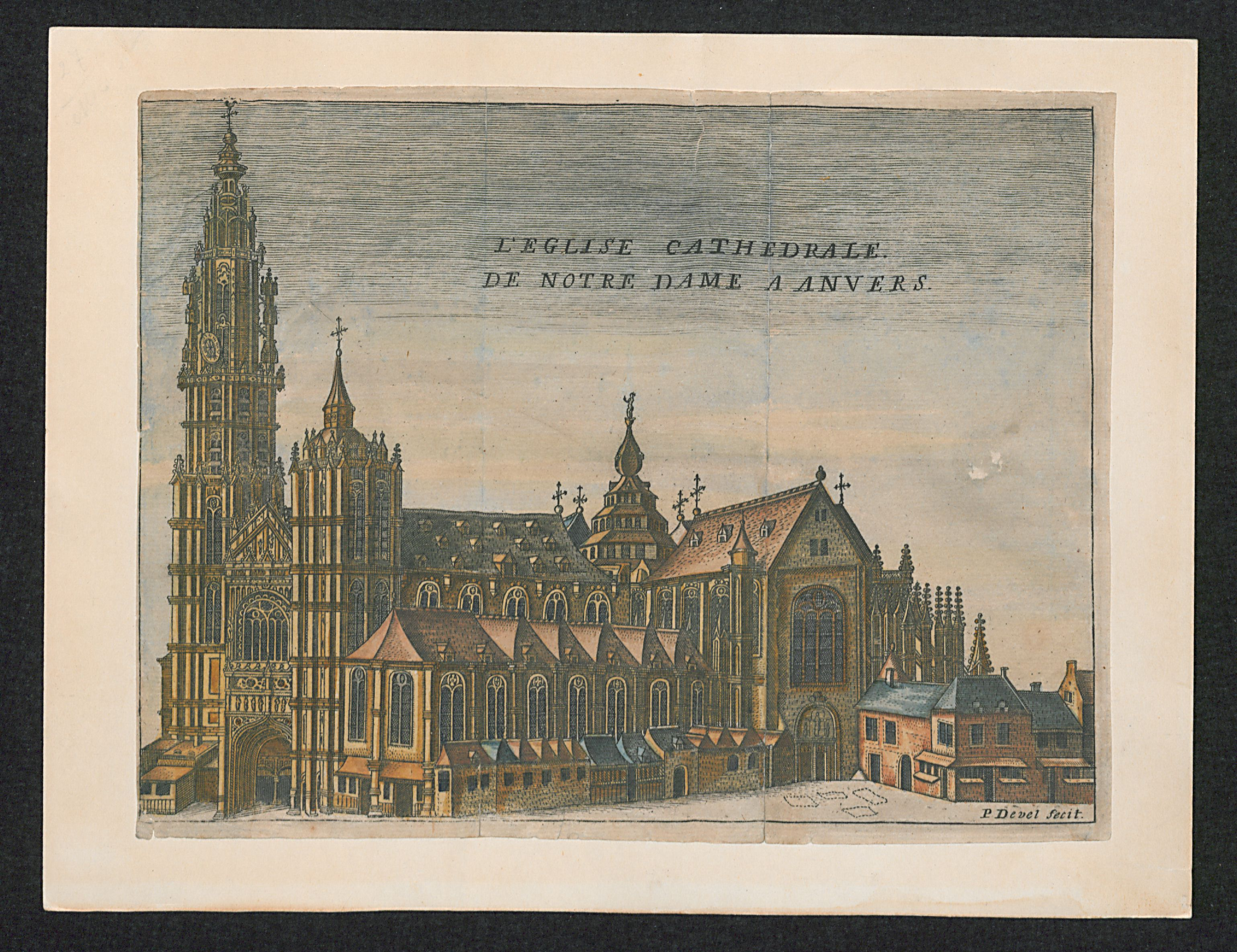
Antwerp Cathedral (1717)

Blavier was born in Liège, and was appointed music master there at St Peter's Church. In 1737 he was chosen to succeed Joseph-Hector Fiocco at Antwerp Cathedral, directing and training the cathedral choir.

He sang with a tenor voice, and played keyboard, violin and cello. Among his compositions was a Mass in D, for four voice parts with string accompaniment, dedicated to the chapter in 1741; this work has survived. A member of the cathedral choir in his charge was the future composer François-Joseph Gossec.

Unable to marry under the terms of his employment, Blavier left the cathedral on his marriage, and in 1768 became singing teacher at St Andrew's Church in Antwerp. He died in 1782, predeceased by several of his children and his wife, and was buried at St Andrew's Church.
