= Resurrection (Rubens, Antwerp) =

Triptych by Peter Paul Rubens

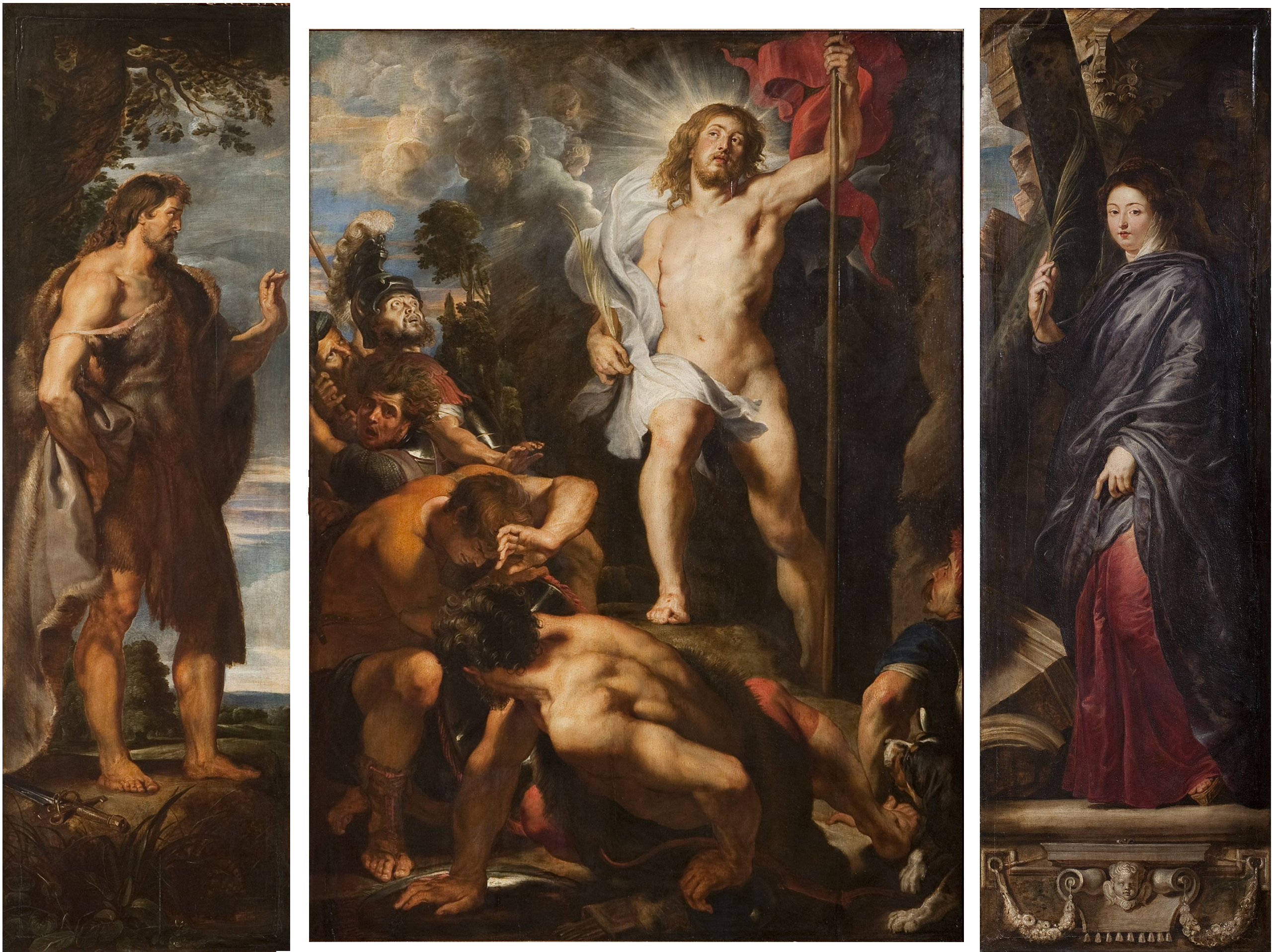
The triptych depicting the Resurrection.

The Resurrection of Christ is a triptych painting in oil on panel by Peter Paul Rubens, of 1611–1612, that is still in the Cathedral of Our Lady in Antwerp, Belgium. The panels were hinged, with the two wings painted on both sides, by this date a rather old-fashioned format.

In the "open" view, the centre panel depicts the Risen Jesus triumphantly emerging from the tomb, surrounded by frightened Roman soldiers. The left-hand panel depicts John the Baptist, while the right-hand panel shows Martina of Rome. These saints are, respectively, the patrons and namesakes of printer Jan Moretus of the Plantin Press, and his widow Martina Plantin, who placed the commission for the triptych.

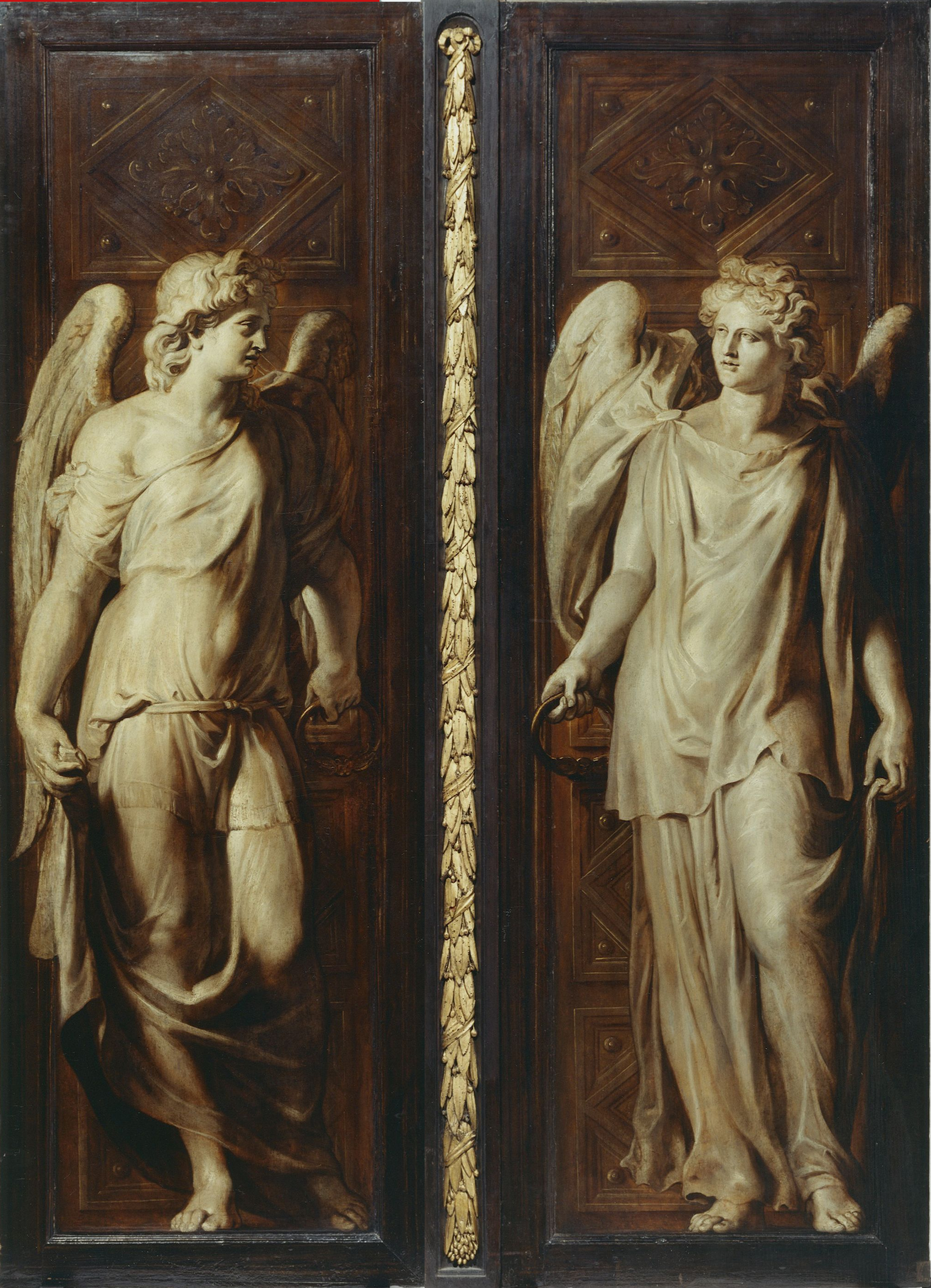
Closed view

The "closed" view shows two angels in grisaille.

In the years shortly before and after Rubens, who lived in Antwerp, painted his Descent from the Cross (1612–14), and Raising of the Cross (1610–11) triptychs for the same church.

Since early 2026, The Resurrection of Christ has not been on display in the Cathedral of Our Lady due to restoration work. This is expected to take at least two years. A photograph of the closed triptych now fills the empty space in the cathedral.
