= Appelman =

Appelman is a Dutch surname. As appelman was a name for a fruit dealer, the surname could have an occupational origin. People with this name include:

- Bartholomeus Appelman (1628–1686), Dutch painter
- Barry Appelman, American computer programmer
- Ted Appelman (born 1980), Canadian curler
- Zach Appelman (born 1985), American actor

== See also ==
- Appelmans
