= Gaspar Gevartius =

Flemish lawyer, neo-Latin poet, philologist, historian and diplomat

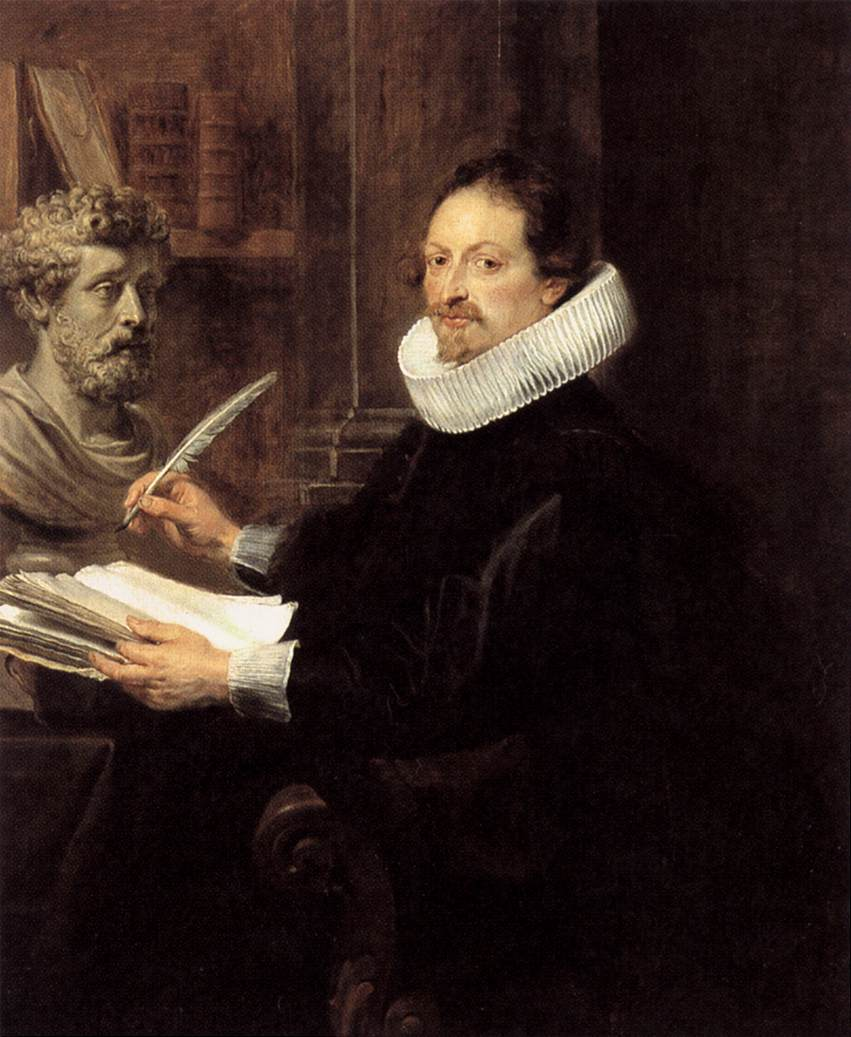
Portrait of Jan Gaspar Gevartius, by Rubens

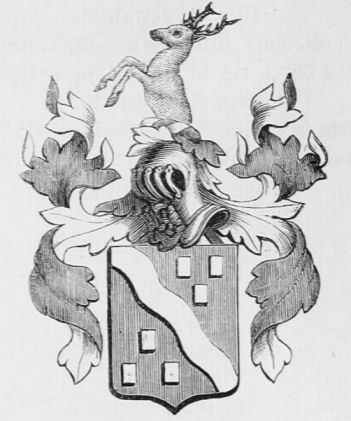
Heraldic crest

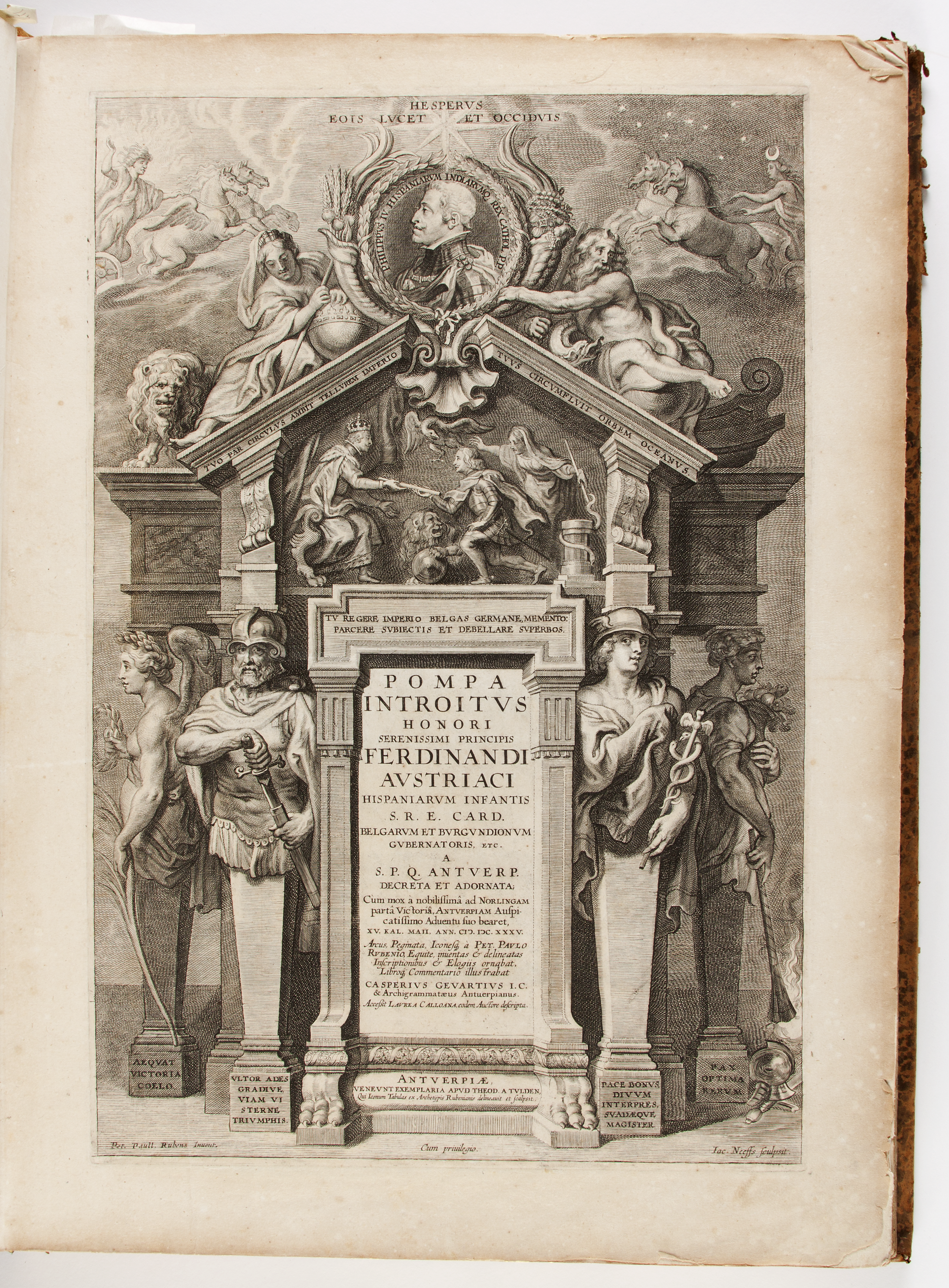
Pompa introitus honori Serenissimi Principis Ferdinandi Austriaci Hispaniarum Infantis

John Gaspar Gevartius or Jan Caspar Gevaerts (1593–1666) was the jurisconsult of Antwerp and in his lifetime a famous philologist. He was a personal friend of Peter Paul Rubens.

== Life ==
Gaspar was born in Turnhout on 6 August 1593, the son of Johannes Gevaerts (1553–1613) and Cornelia Aerssens, whose father had been mayor of Bergen op Zoom. He was educated by the Jesuits, going on to study the Liberal Arts at Louvain University. He was briefly in the service of Benjamin Aubery du Maurier, French Ambassador in The Hague, where he became friends with Daniel Heinsius, writing an epithalamium on his marriage. In 1617 he moved to Paris, entering the household of Henri de Mesmes. In 1621 he was granted a law degree by the University of Douai.

After 1621 he became an important functionary of the city government of Antwerp. He wrote works on poetry and sciences, one of which treats of Marcus Aurelius. His reputation was known by the Archduchess Isabella Clara Eugenia and Emperor Ferdinand III. Pierre Gassendi's biography of Nicolas Peiresc mentions that in 1620 he consulted Gevartius, "a famous and (if ever any) a true Schollar", about the Duke of Aarschot's cabinet of curiosities. He was appointed councillor of state and historiographer royal by both Philip IV of Spain and the Emperor Ferdinand III.

On 14 May 1625 Gevartius married Marie Haecx in the church of St James in Antwerp. Their son died at the age of 12; their daughter married Charles Sivori, whose father, Anthonie Sivori, served eleven terms as mayor of Antwerp.

In 1625, 1627 and 1632 he served as secretary to the Antwerp branch of the Sodality of Our Lady. He was admitted to citizenship of the city of Antwerp on 11 September 1632.

He was a personal friend of Rubens, and had a portrait painted by him and Paul de Vos with a bust of Marcus Aurelius. He took care of Albert Rubens (1614–1657) when his father was on mission of the Archduke. Correspondence between Gevartius and Rubens is conserved in the Royal Library of Belgium. He worked together with Rubens and Theodoor van Thulden on the Pompa introitus honori Serenissimi Principis Ferdinandi Austriaci Hispaniarum Infantis ....

Gevartius received the tonsure in the chapel of the bishop of Antwerp on 8 February 1665. He died in Antwerp on 23 March 1666 and was buried in the Cathedral of Our Lady.

== Works ==
- Publii Papinii Statii Opera omnia, Leiden, 1616
- Electorum libri III. In quibus plurima veterum scriptorum loca obscura & controuersa explicantur, illustrantur & emendantur. Published by Sebastian Cramoy, Paris, 1619
- Pompa Introitus Honore ... Ferdinandi Austriaci,1641
- Inscriptiones theatri pacis Hispano-batavicae, Antwerp, 1648
- Inscriptiones honori serenissimi principis, Leopoldi Gulielmi, archiducis Austriae, Antwerp, 1648
- Hymenaeus pacifer; sive theatrum pacis Hispano-gallicae. Published by Plantin Press, Antwerp, 1661
- Monumentum sepulchrale, sive inscriptiones tumuli, Antwerp, 1666
- Votum ad divam virginem aspricollinam sospitatricem, pro salute ac longaevitate serenissimorum principum Alberti et Isabellae

== Studies ==
A biography of Gevartius by Marcel Hoc was published under the title Le déclin de l'humanisme belge: étude sur Jean-Gaspard Gevaerts, philologue et poète (1593–1666) (Brussels, Paris and London, 1922).

== See also ==
- Portrait of Cornelis van der Geest a painting mistakenly thought to be Gevartius
