= Andreas Pevernage =

Flemish composer

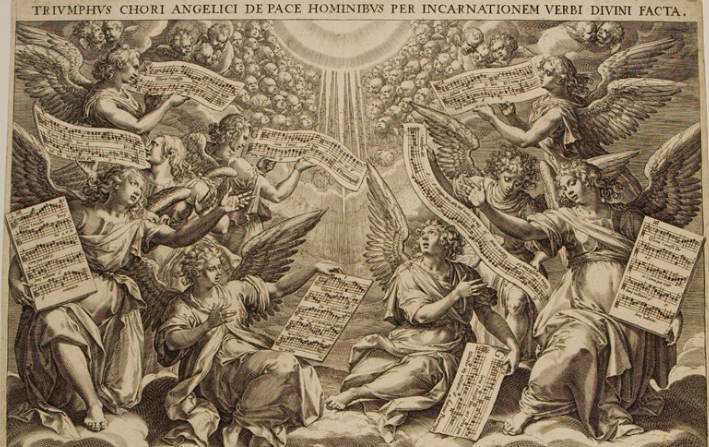
Motet-image Gloria in Excelsis, angels holding a composition by Andreas Pevernage, detail of engraving by Johannes Sadeler after a design by Maerten de Vos, 1587

Andreas Pevernage or Andries Pevernage (1542 or 1543 – 30 July 1591) was a Flemish composer of the late Renaissance and a choirmaster in Bruges, Kortrijk, and Antwerp. He was one of a few composers from the Low Countries who remained in his native land throughout the turbulent period of religious conflict in the late 16th century. He was a skilled composer of chansons, motets and madrigals.

== Life ==
Pevernage was born in Harelbeke, a small town near to Kortrijk, and probably spent his boyhood years as a singer in the church in Kortrijk. He became the choirmaster at the church of St Salvator in Bruges on 21 January 1563, and later that same year became choirmaster at the Onze Lieve Vrouwkerk (Notre Dame) in Kortrijk. In 1564 he became chaplain there, and rose to the position of permanent vicar in 1569. Also in Kortrijk, he joined the guild of St. Cecilia, for which he wrote some of his music.

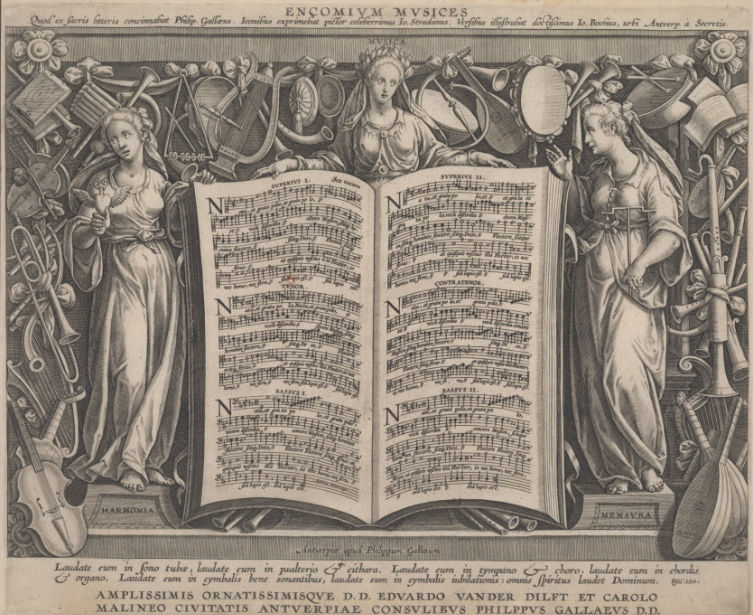
Title page of Encomium Musices, showing Pevernage's six-part motet 'Nata et grata polo', engraved and published by Philip Galle, c. 1590

The religious wars of the 16th century ravaged the Netherlands as they had adjacent regions, and war came to Kortrijk. He fled the city in 1577 or 1578 with his family when the Calvinists took over; they had little use for music, and as a Roman Catholic he was unsafe during this period of persecution; his family went to Antwerp, where they stayed until the next year, during which Pevernage was appointed to the post of choirmaster in Bruges. However, Calvinists captured this town as well, and Pevernage was out of a job until 1584, at which time he regained his former employment in Kortrijk. On 29 October 1585 he was appointed choirmaster at the Cathedral of Our Lady (Antwerp); this was shortly after the Spanish capture of the town (see Siege of Antwerp (1584-1585); the Protestant rebels had been forcibly ejected from the city in August). One of Pevernage's activities there was to rebuild the extensive music library, which had been ransacked and burned by Calvinists. He remained at this post until his death in 1591, and was buried in the cathedral.

== Music ==
Pevernage was a fairly prolific composer of both sacred and secular vocal music; of his output, about 235 pieces (115 sacred, 120 secular) remain. No specifically instrumental music has survived.

His output of sacred includes six masses, published in Antwerp after his death (1602), for from five to seven voices; a collection of motets entitled Cantiones sacrae (1578), which also includes some secular works, many of which are occasional pieces written in honor of local nobility, including Margaret of Parma; and a group of 14 Marian antiphons, like the masses published posthumously. Stylistically they are typical of late-16th-century practice, alternating homophonic and polyphonic textures, and using groups of voices in alternation in a cori spezzati style; the influence of the Venetian school was felt even as far away as the Netherlands.

Pevernage also wrote Italian madrigals, in Italian; it was a wildly popular form even in northern Europe (the vogue in England was just beginning in the late 1580s), and also wrote many French chansons, published in four separate books. They make use of syncopation, melismas, and complex rhythms.

== References and further reading ==
- Andreas Pevernage, Cantiones sacrae. Ed. Gerald R. Hoekstra, 3 vols., Middleton, WI, 2010
- Kristin Forney. "Andreas Pevernage". In Deane L. Root (ed.). Grove Music Online. Oxford Music Online. (subscription required)
- Kamiel Cooremans, "Andreas Pevernage", The New Grove Dictionary of Music and Musicians, ed. Stanley Sadie. 20 vol. London, Macmillan Publishers Ltd., 1980. ISBN 1-56159-174-2 (note: the article in the 1980 New Grove is completely different from that in the online edition)
- Gustave Reese, Music in the Renaissance. New York, W.W. Norton & Co., 1954. ISBN 0-393-09530-4
