= Joseph-Hector Fiocco =

Belgian composer and violinist

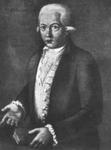
- Born: 20 January 1703; Brussels
- Died: 21 June 1741 (aged 38); Brussels
- Occupations: Church musician; Composer
- Organizations: Antwerp Cathedral; Brussels Cathedral

Joseph-Hector Fiocco (20 January 1703 – 21 June 1741), born in Brussels, was a composer and harpsichordist of the late Baroque period.

His father, the Italian composer Pietro Antonio Fiocco, and one of his older step-brothers Jean-Joseph Fiocco gave him much of his musical education.

He also learned Greek and Latin well enough to be able to become a school teacher in both those subjects.

Joseph Hector Fiocco worked under his stepbrother's direction at the Ducal Chapel of the Notre-Dame du Sablon most sources cite some time before 1730. In 1730, Joseph Hector became sous-maitre (submaster) of the Notre-Dame du Sablon; he did not keep this position for long, because he resigned in 1731 to become sangmeester (choirmaster) at Antwerp Cathedral.

At Antwerp (1731–37) he was in charge of the music. In 1737 he returned to his birthplace and worked in the Collegiate Church of St. Michael and St. Gudula (future cathedral of Brussels). He died in Brussels at the age of 38.

In connection with his cathedral employment, Fiocco wrote many choral works, including motets and Mass settings. Some of his most significant compositions are Lamentations du Jeudi Saint, a Missa solemnis and Pièces de Clavecin. His two suites for harpsichord were dedicated to the Duke of Arenberg, and they incorporate French and Italian styles. The first suite begins in the style of Couperin and ends with four Italian-style movements: Adagio, Allegro, Andante, and Vivace. He is also known to Suzuki violin students for an Allegro (transcribed from the first harpsichord suite, Pièces de clavecin, Op.1), which is part of the Book Six Suzuki violin repertoire and has been recorded by Itzhak Perlman and Augustin Hadelich, among others. This piece has also been arranged for string quartet, and is sometimes heard at weddings.

== Sources ==
- Satz, Don. "Review".
- Stellfeld, Christiane. Les Fiocco, une famille de musiciens belges aux XVIIe et XVIIIe siècles. Imprint [Brussels, Palace of Academies, 1941] 172 pages, 3 leaves, illustrations (including ports., facsimiles, music) 29 cm
