= Jan Appelmans =

Belgian architect (1352–1411)

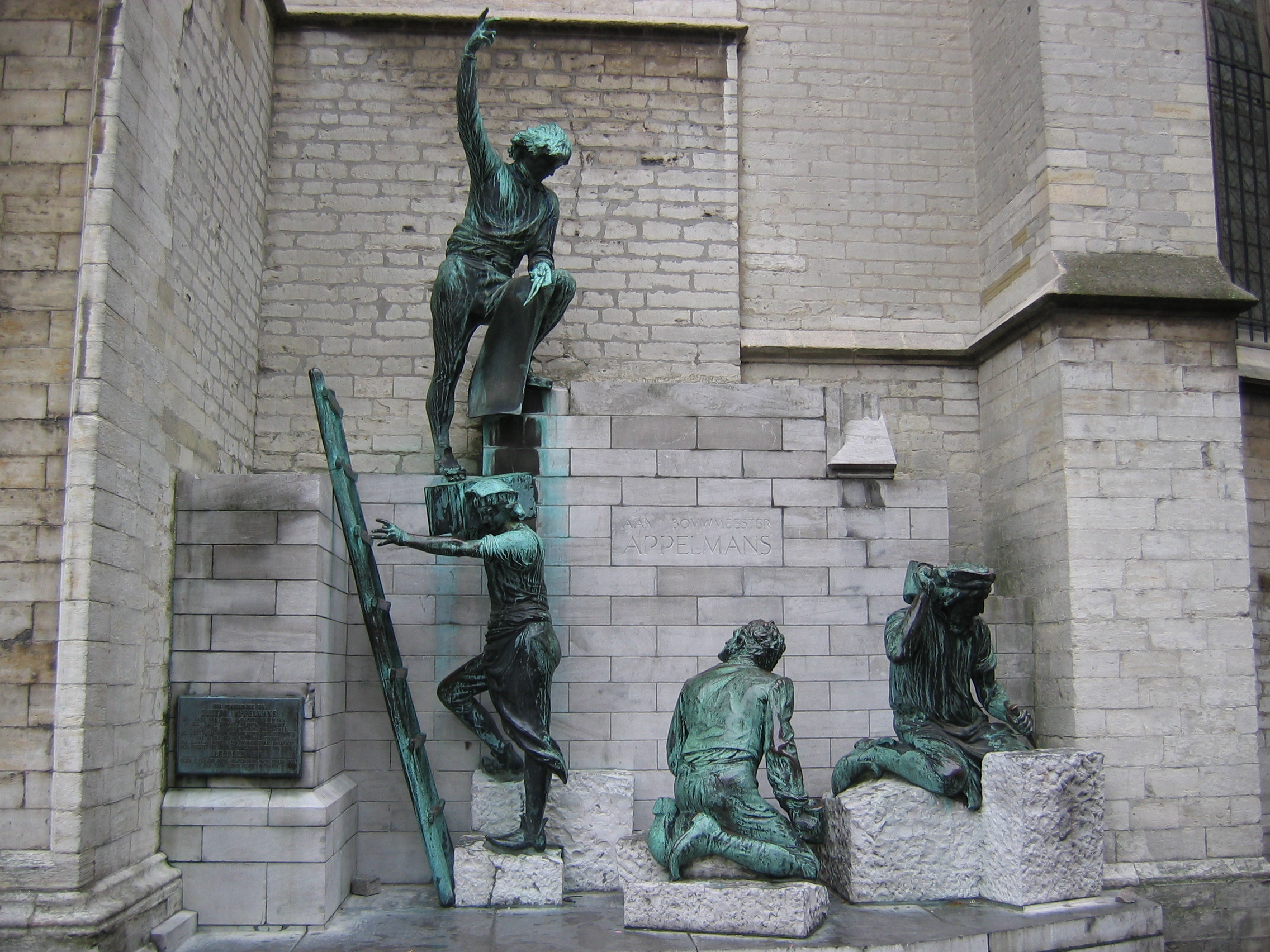
Monument dedicated to Jan and Pieter Appelmans, Handschoenmarkt, Antwerp.

Jan Appelmans (1352–1411) was the first architect of the Cathedral of Our Lady, Antwerp, succeeded by his son Pieter Appelmans.
