= Pieter Appelmans =

Belgian architect

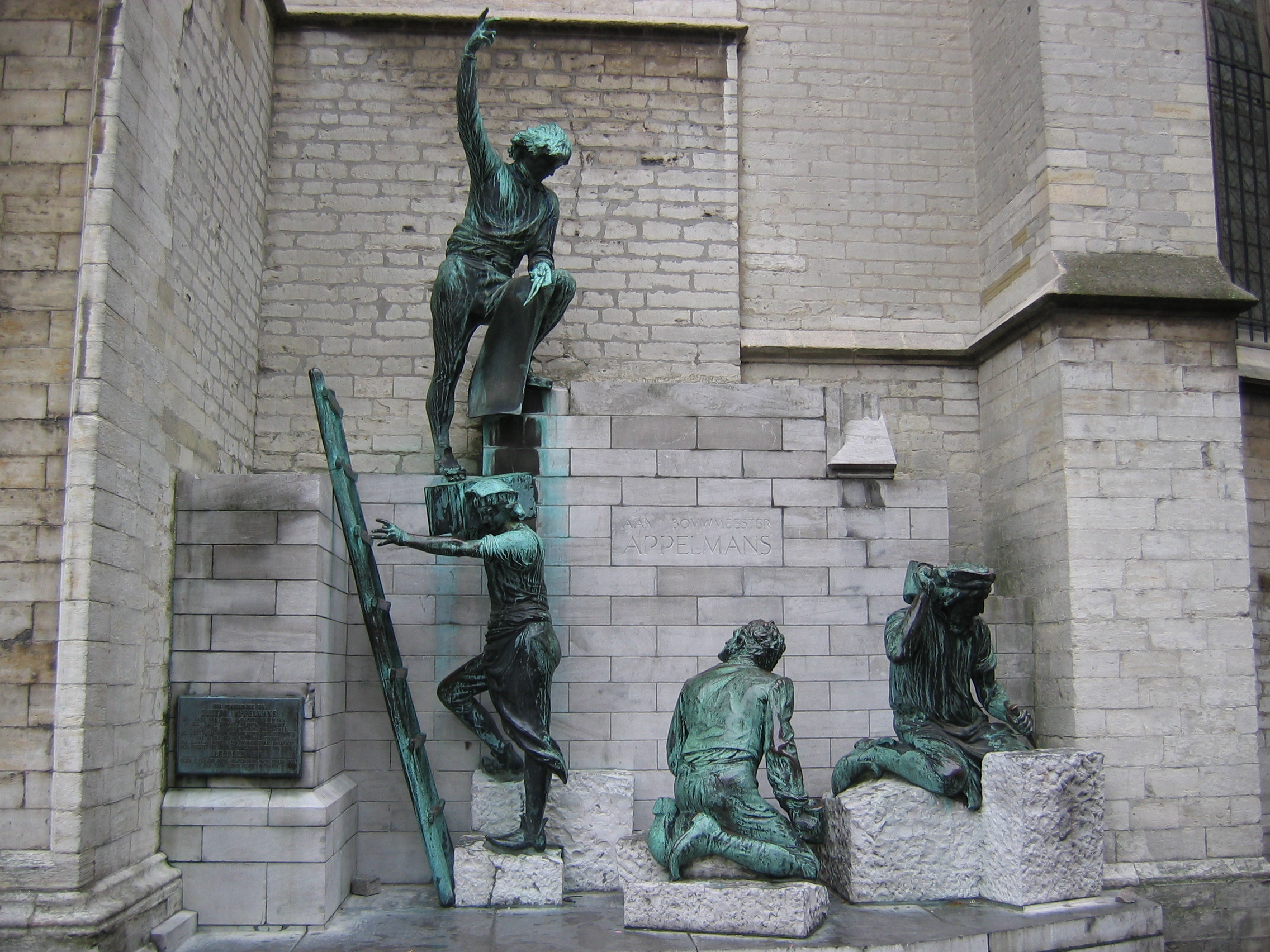
Monument dedicated to Jan and Pieter Appelmans, Handschoenmarkt, Antwerp.

Pieter Appelmans (1373 – 16 May 1434) was one of the architects of the Cathedral of Our Lady, Antwerp, together with his father Jan Appelmans.
