= Gerard Appelmans =

Gerard Appelmans was a 13th-century hermit in the Low Countries who wrote a theologically and linguistically innovative mystical gloss on the Our Father entitled Glose op den pater noster. This treatise is part of a manuscript now in the Royal Library of Belgium, MS 3067–73, folios 143-151v. It was edited and published in 1927.
