= Cathedral of Our Lady (Antwerp) =

Roman Catholic cathedral in Antwerp, Belgium

- Dutch: Onze-Lieve-Vrouwekathedraal
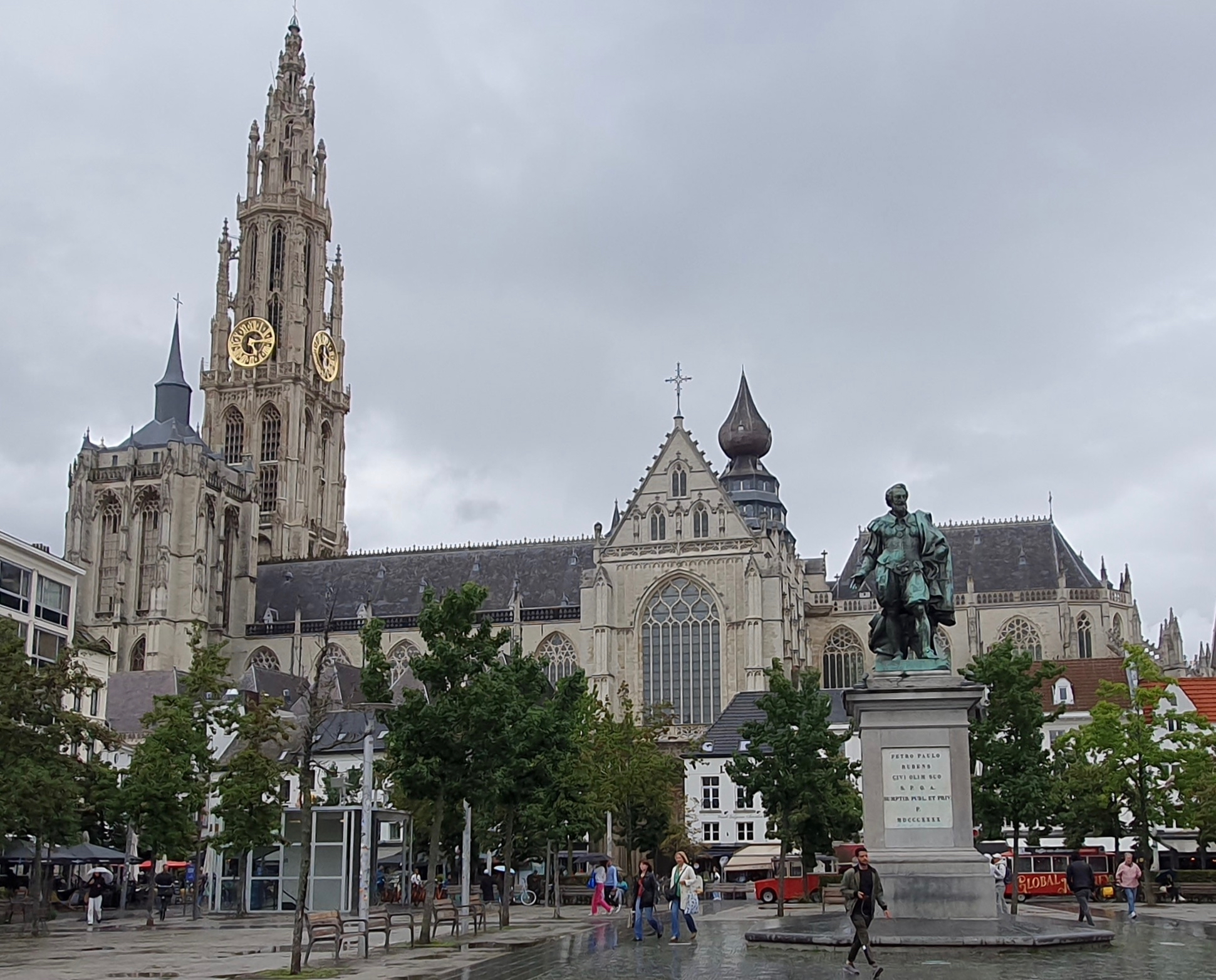
- Cathedral of Our Lady

Religion
- Affiliation: Catholic Church
- Region: Diocese of Antwerp
- Rite: Roman
- Ecclesiastical or organisational status: Cathedral
- Leadership: Johan Bonny
- Year consecrated: 1521

Location
- Location: Antwerp
- Interactive map of Cathedral of Our Lady
- Coordinates: 51°13′14″N 4°24′02″E

Architecture
- Architects: Jan and Pieter Appelmans
- Type: Cathedral
- Style: Gothic
- Groundbreaking: 1352
- Completed: 1521

Specifications
- Direction of façade: W
- Capacity: 25,000
- Length: 120 metres (390 ft)
- Width: 75 metres (246 ft)
- Width (nave): 53.5 metres (176 ft)
- Height (max): 123 metres (404 ft)

Website
- De Kathedraal

UNESCO World Heritage Site
- Part of: Belfries of Belgium and France
- Criteria: Cultural: ii, iv
- Reference: 943-002
- Inscription: 1999 (23rd Session)

The Cathedral of Our Lady (Dutch: Onze-Lieve-Vrouwekathedraal) is a Roman Catholic cathedral in Antwerp, Belgium. Today's seat of the Diocese of Antwerp started in 1352 and, although the first stage of construction was ended in 1521, has never been fully completed. It was constructed in the Gothic style by architects Jan and Pieter Appelmans. It contains a number of significant works by the Baroque painter Peter Paul Rubens, as well as paintings by artists such as Otto van Veen, Jacob de Backer and Marten de Vos. The cathedral is the largest Gothic church in Belgium, with its tower rising 123 meters (404 ft) over the city.

The belfry of the cathedral is included in the Belfries of Belgium and France entry in the list of UNESCO World Heritage Sites.

== History ==
=== Previous buildings on the site ===
The first Christian missionaries arrived in the 7th century. The first parish church dedicated to Saint Peter and Saint Paul was constructed in the current Sint Michielsstraat. After the Viking raids in 836, the church was damaged and restored, and subsequently dedicated to Saint Michael. In the 10th century, a group of twelve secular canons were connected to this church. They would dedicate all of their time to the Liturgy of the Hours, and mainly opposed the beliefs of the established Roman Catholic Church. Upon hearing of their dissident behavior, the bishop of the Roman Catholic Archdiocese of Cambrai (to which Antwerp belonged at the time) then sent Norbert of Xanten to discipline them. In 1124, Norbert of Xanten convinced four of the secular canons to start a norbertine abbey and thus the parish church became a monastery church, known as St. Michael's Abbey. The eight other secular canons preferred to keep their freedom and moved to a different location, a chapel dedicated to Our Lady, the Virgin Mary.

This chapel became Antwerp's new parish church, and was located between the Saint Michael residential area, and an older settlement around the area of Het Steen.

=== Romanesque church and Gothic cathedral ===
Becoming more popular, the chapel was demolished and replaced by a much bigger Romanesque church. The three-aisled nave corresponded in width to the cathedral's current central aisle, the inner and partly the middle aisles. The cloverleaf-shaped eastern section with a full aisle had a width of no less than 42 m. In 1294, the church got a novum opus extension, indicating the first signs of Gothic architecture.

In 1352, construction was begun on a new Our Lady's church which would become the largest Gothic church in Belgium. In the beginning, it was to be provided with two towers of equal height. In 1521, after nearly 170 years, the new church of Our Lady was ready. The south tower reached only as far as the third-string course.

=== Damage and later history ===
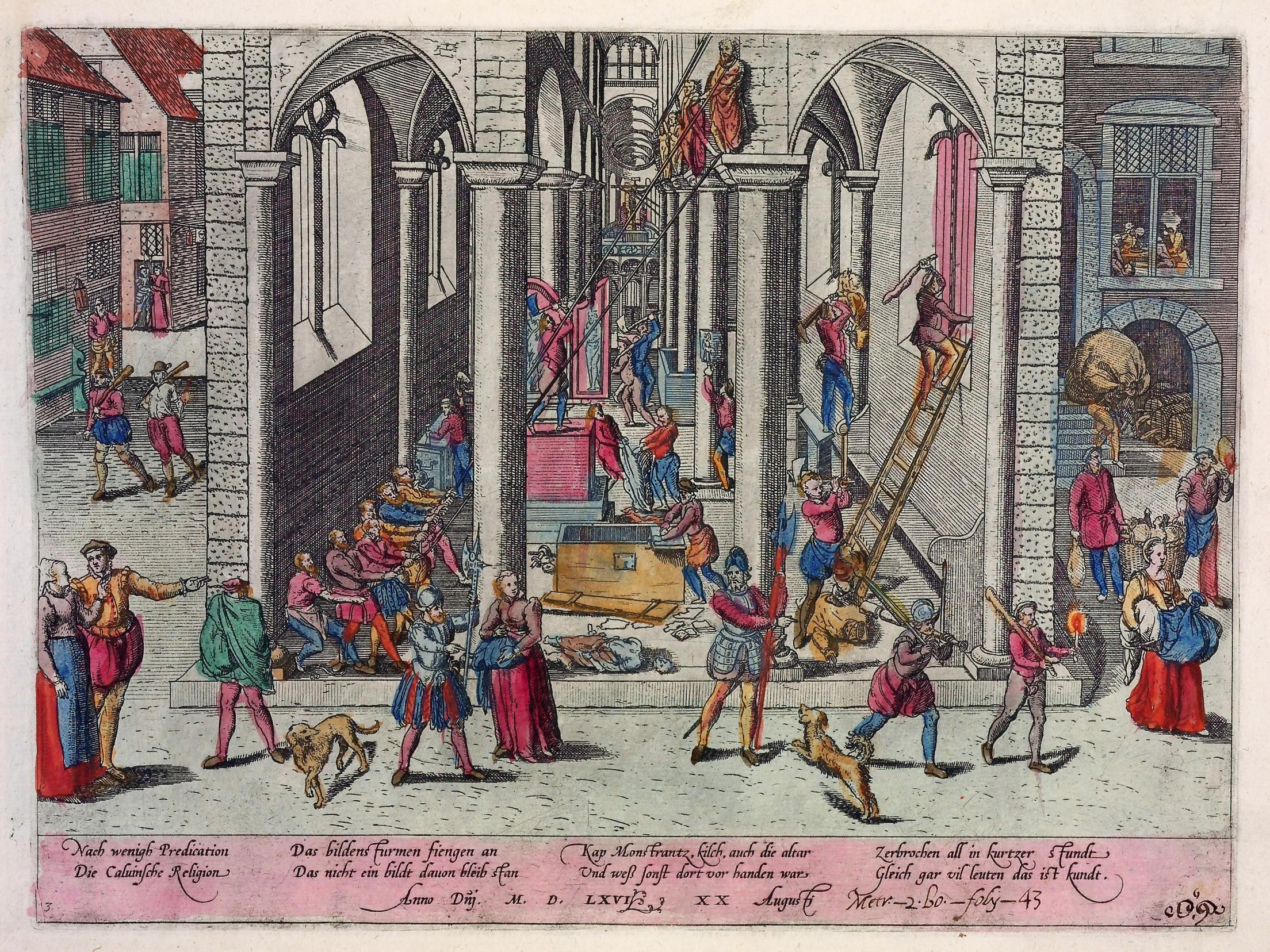
Print of the destruction in the church, the "signature event" of the Beeldenstorm, 20 August 1566, by Frans Hogenberg

During the night of 5–6 October 1533, the new church caught fire. The Antwerp mayor Lancelot II of Ursel is credited with playing a major part in the salvation of the church. Through his active help and coordination, the cathedral is said to have been saved from total ruin. Nevertheless, 57 altars had not been saved and went up in flames. Lancelot suffered serious injuries but survived the ordeal according to the letters of the Italian chronicler Francesco Guicciardini. The completion of the second tower was delayed due to the fire and was ultimately abandoned. The church was made the cathedral of the bishopric of Antwerp in 1559. It lost this title in 1801 during the period of French occupation of Belgium by the promulgation of the Concordat of 1801. It was made a cathedral again in 1961.

During the Iconoclasm of 20 August 1566 (part of the Beeldenstorm at the start of the Eighty Years' War), Protestants destroyed a large part of the cathedral's interior. The eye-witness Richard Clough, a Welsh Protestant merchant then in Antwerp, wrote that the cathedral: "looked like a hell, with above 10,000 torches burning, and such a noise as if heaven and earth had got together, with falling of images and beating down of costly works, such sort that the spoil was so great that a man could not well pass through the church. So that in fine [short], I cannot write you in x sheets of paper the strange sight I saw there, organs and all destroyed."

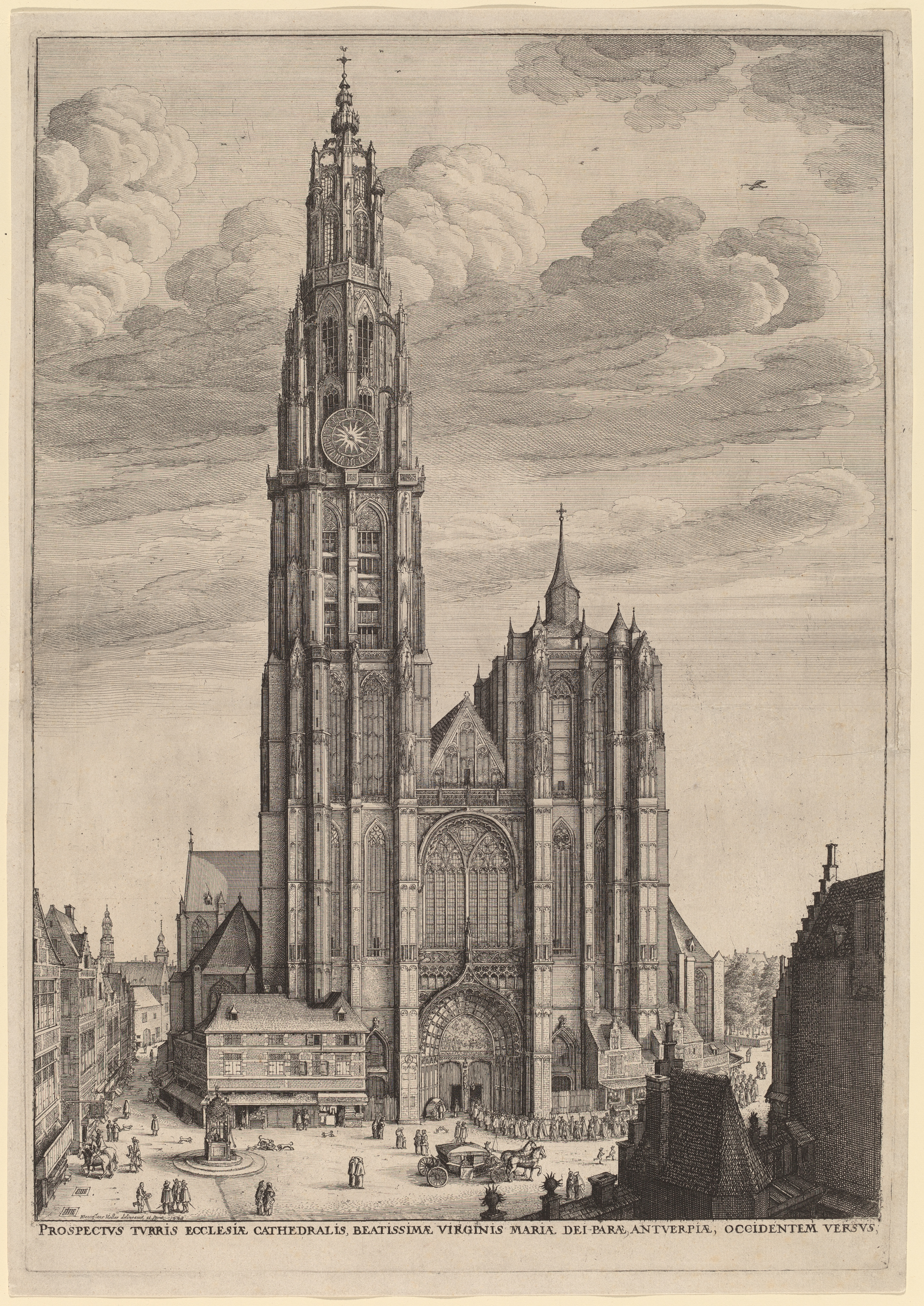
Antwerp Cathedral, Wenceslaus Hollar, 1649, National Gallery of Art

When Antwerp came under Protestant administration in 1581 a number of artistic treasures were once again destroyed, removed or sold. With the fall of Antwerp in 1585 Roman Catholic authority was restored.

In 1794 the French revolutionaries who conquered the region plundered Our Lady's Cathedral and inflicted serious damage. Around 1798, the French administration intended to demolish the building but after each blow, the cathedral was able to recover. In 1816, various important works of art were returned from Paris, including three Rubens masterpieces. Over the course of the 19th century, the church was completely restored and refurnished.

The Cathedral was looted and vandalized in 1914 by German soldiers after the Siege of Antwerp (1914). Many of its treasures were taken to Berlin and not returned until after the Armistice of 11 November 1918

Between 1965 and 1993, a complete restoration took place.

== Musical life ==
At the beginning of the 15th century, the cathedral's choir started developing an active musical life, and as a result, the cathedral's importance in the history of music soon soared. Johannes Ockeghem, one of the most important composers of the 15th century, served here as a vicar-singer in 1443, and so did Jacob Obrecht between 1492 and 1497. Sixteenth-century choirmasters included Antoine Barbe, Geert van Turnhout, Séverin Cornet, and Andreas Pevernage. Organists who worked at the cathedral include Henry Bredemers (1493–1501), who went on to become a teacher to Philip the Handsome's children and the renowned English composer John Bull (1615–1628), who fled to Flanders from his home country escaping justice. From 1725 to 1731 Willem de Fesch served as Kapelmeester, followed from 1731 to 1737 by Joseph-Hector Fiocco, and from 1737 by André-Joseph Blavier. Lesser known but locally important figures, such as Jacobus Barbireau and Andreas Pevernage, also worked at the cathedral.

== Significant architectural details ==
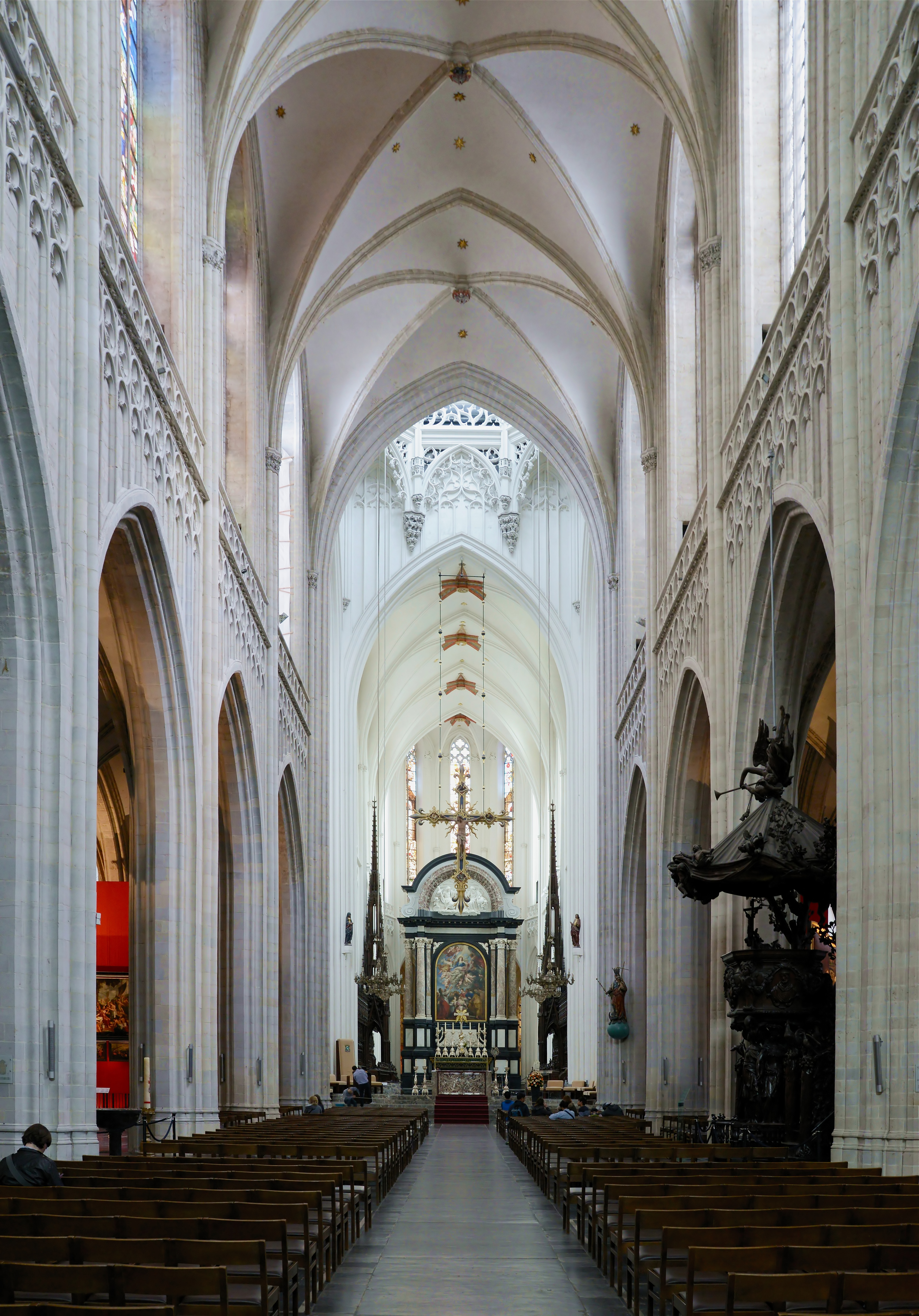
Main nave

The church's one finished spire is 123 meters (404 ft) tall, the tallest church tower in the Benelux. Charles V, Holy Roman Emperor commented that the spire should be kept under glass, and Napoleon compared the spire to Mechlin lace. The largest bell in the tower requires 16 bell ringers.

The west portal features statues which include the missionary Saint Willibrord. He is thought to have spent time in Antwerp in the 7th century.

== Major works of art ==
The cathedral holds a number of major works of art:

- The effigy from the Tomb of Isabella of Bourbon
- The Raising of the Cross – Peter Paul Rubens
- Assumption of the Virgin Mary – Peter Paul Rubens
- The Descent from the Cross – Peter Paul Rubens
- The Resurrection of Christ – Peter Paul Rubens

Two of these artworks, The Raising of the Cross (originally the main altarpiece of the St Walburga church) in Antwerp and The Descent from the Cross, were taken to France by the French occupiers during Napoleon's reign. They were returned to the cathedral in the 19th century. The paintings were stolen a second time by the Imperial German Army in 1914 and taken to the Berlin Palace and were only returned after the Armistice of 11 November 1918.

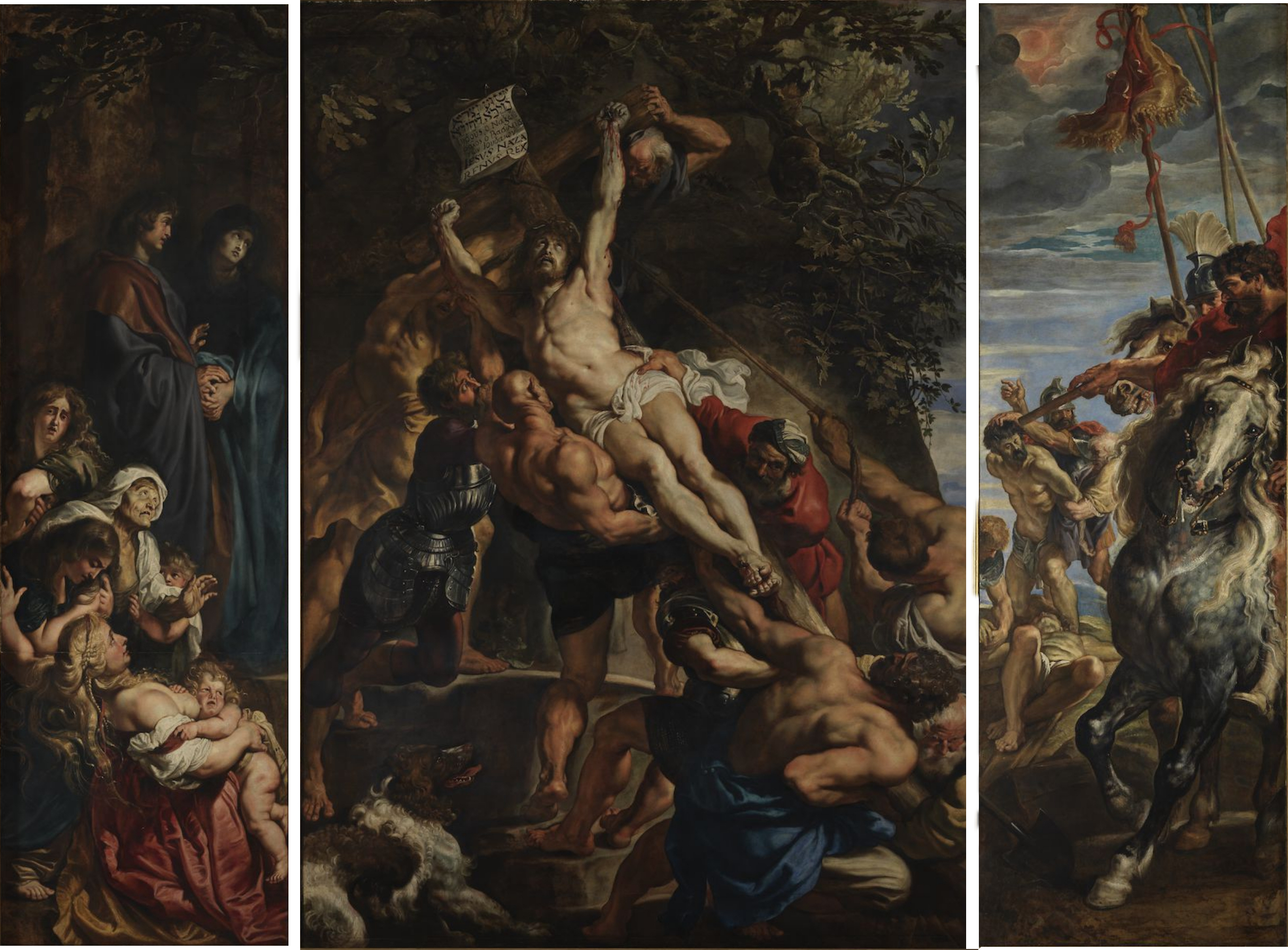
The Raising of the Cross, Peter Paul Rubens, 1610–11

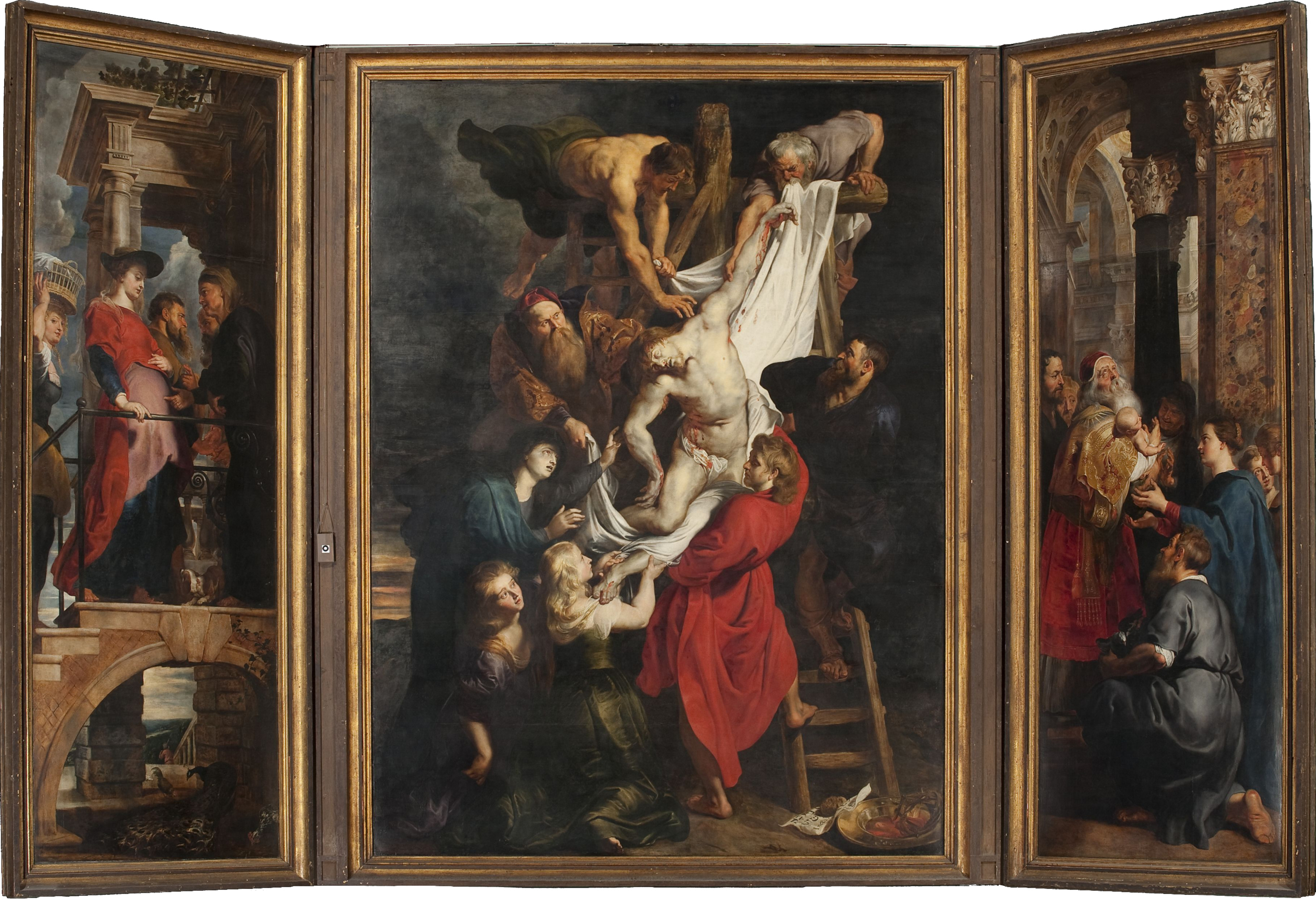
The Descent from the Cross triptych, Rubens, 1612–1614

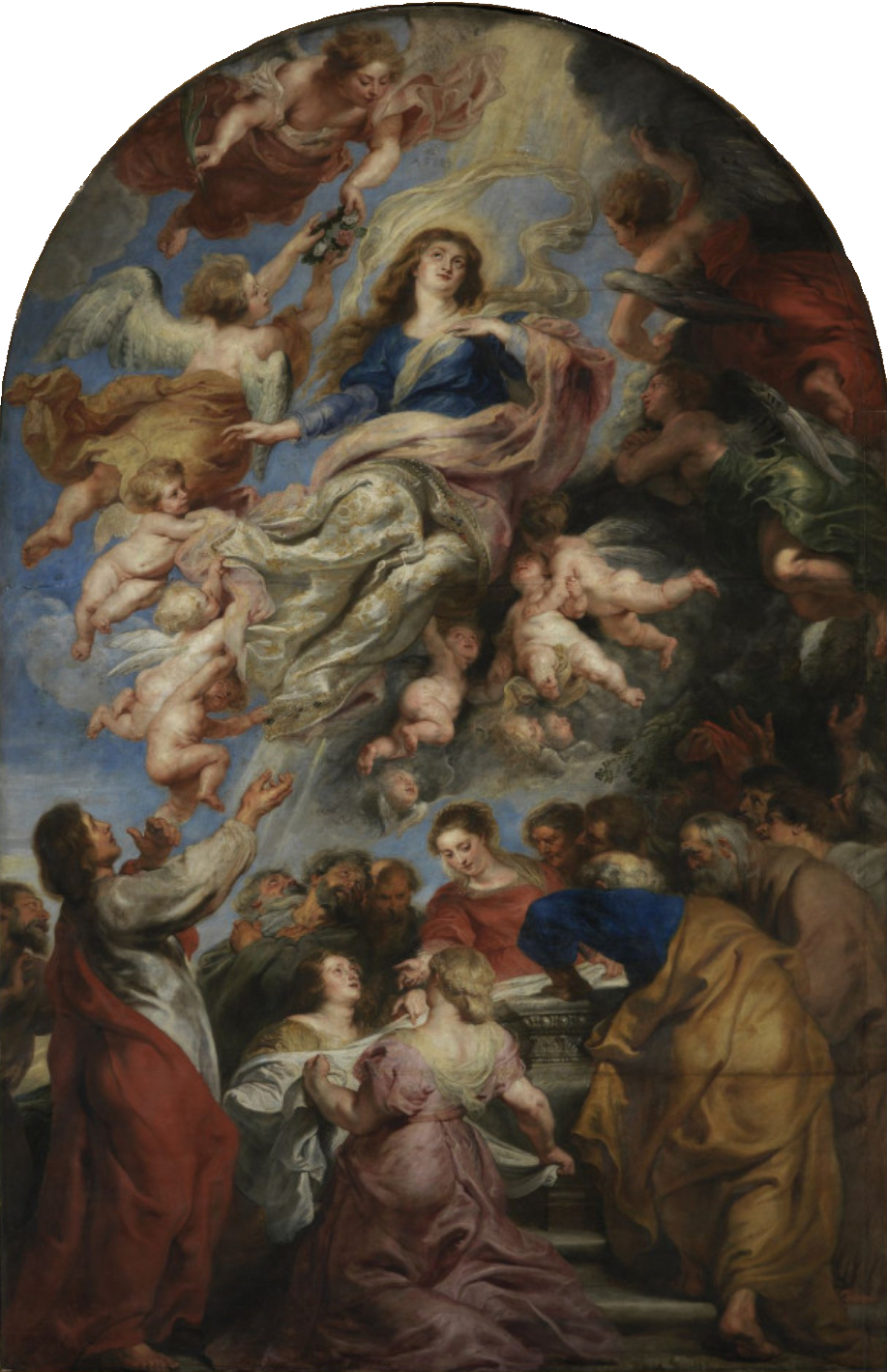
The Assumption of the Virgin, Rubens, 1626

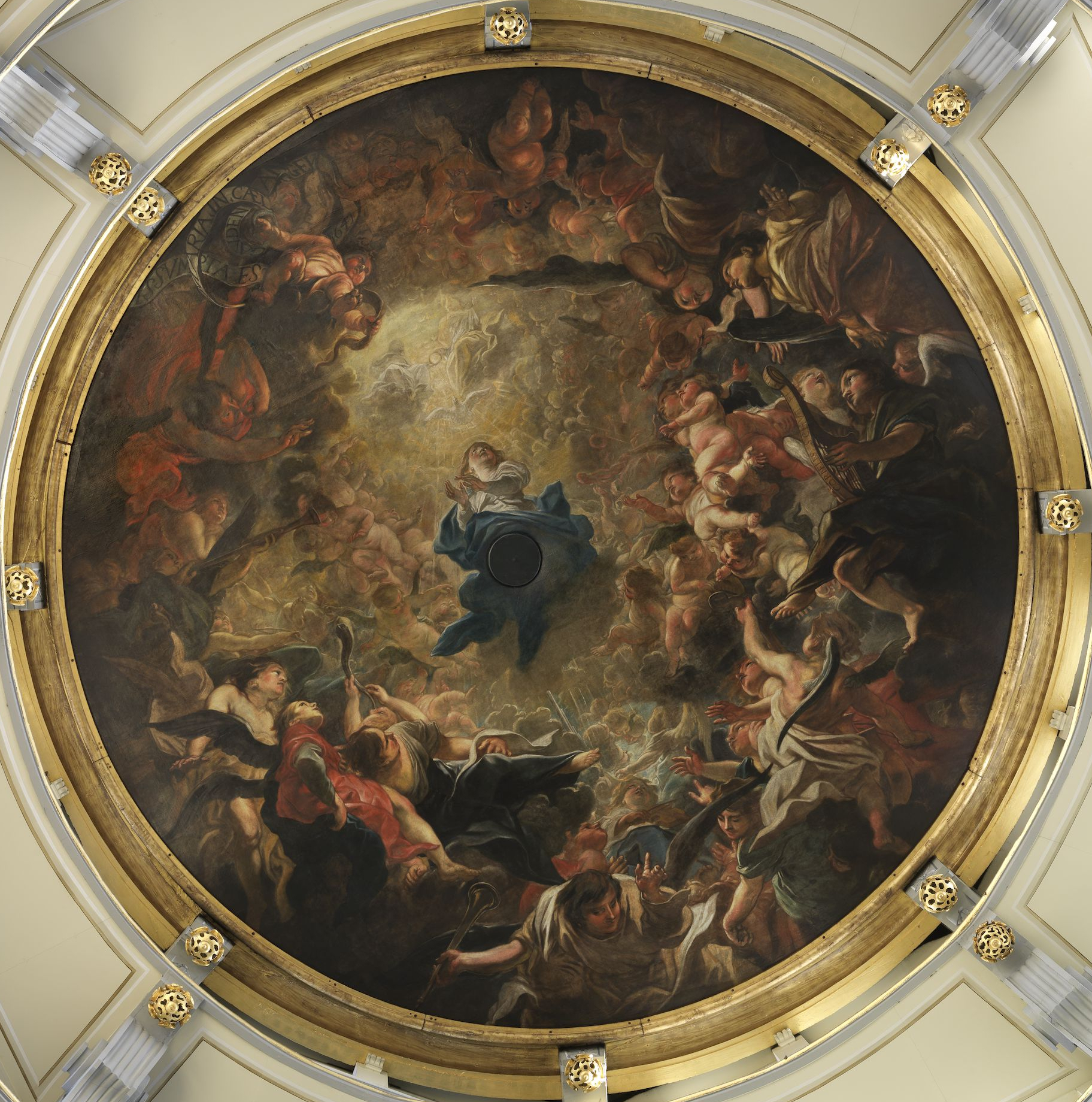
Assumption of Mary, Cornelis Schut, 1648

== Stained glass ==
The cathedral has several stained glass windows with religious images.

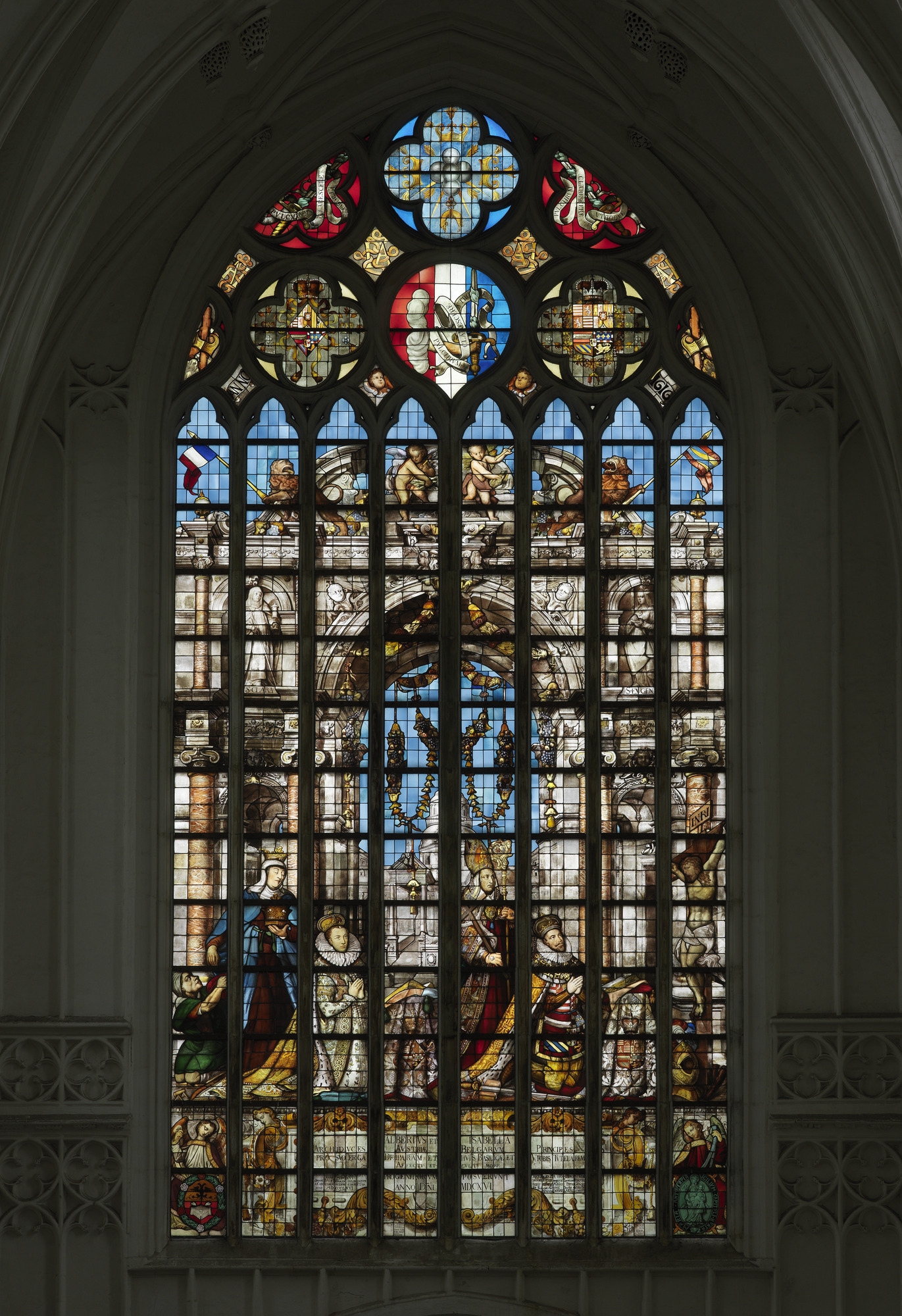
The Archdukes Albert and Isabella worshipping the Cross, Cornelis Cussers, 17th century

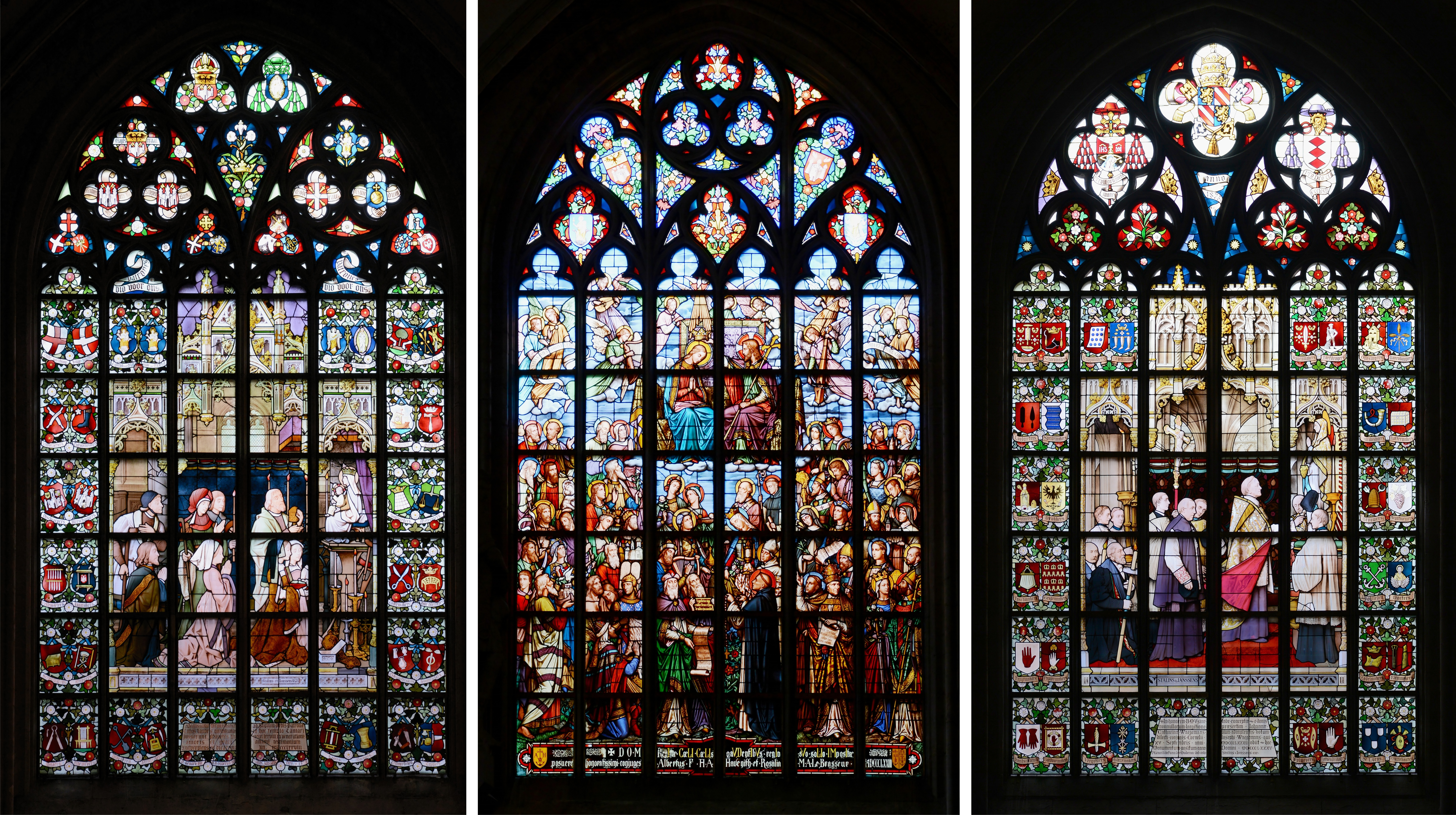
Stained-glass windows. From left to right: Our Lady of Stekske, by Stalins & Janssens, 1878; Saint Ursula and Saint Gaspar, by E. Didron, 1873; and Dedication of the statue of Our Lady of Lourdes by archbishop Deschamps, by Stalins & Janssens, 1885

== Carillon ==
The cathedral has a carillon with 49 bells. The largest bell or bourdon is named Karolus. It was cast on the Groenplaats in 1507 by the brothers Willem & Jaspar Moer from 's Hertogenbosch and weighs 6,434 kilograms (14,185 lb). The inscription indicates that the bell was intended as an hour bell, storm bell and triumphal bell. Karolus was the third storm bell that served in the tower. The bell was consecrated on 15 August 1507 in the presence of Karel, Lord of the Netherlands (the later Emperor Charles V), after whom the bell is named.

The tower houses one of the largest and heaviest bell ensembles of Belgium. The bells represent no less than five centuries of bell casting art of the historic Netherlands. In particular, the bells Karolus and Mary are among the finest of the past and present. Until the beginning of the twentieth century, the tower housed two carillons, owned by respectively the city of Antwerp and the cathedral. The cathedral carillon had fallen into disuse. It was, except for the ringing bells, removed from the tower in the first half of the twentieth century. During the 1930s there were changes made to the bell chair of the cathedral tower.

As an unfortunate consequence, the two largest bells, Karolus and Thomas, were hung so that they risk to hit each other when rung simultaneously. Fortunately the bells stayed undamaged after such an accident. Consequently they never ring together. The removed cathedral carillon bells were hung after the Second World War in the rebuilt tower of St. Catherine Church in Hoogstraten. The smallest remaining ringing bells of the Cathedral were replaced as well by two new ones that would fit better in the ensemble.

== Burials ==
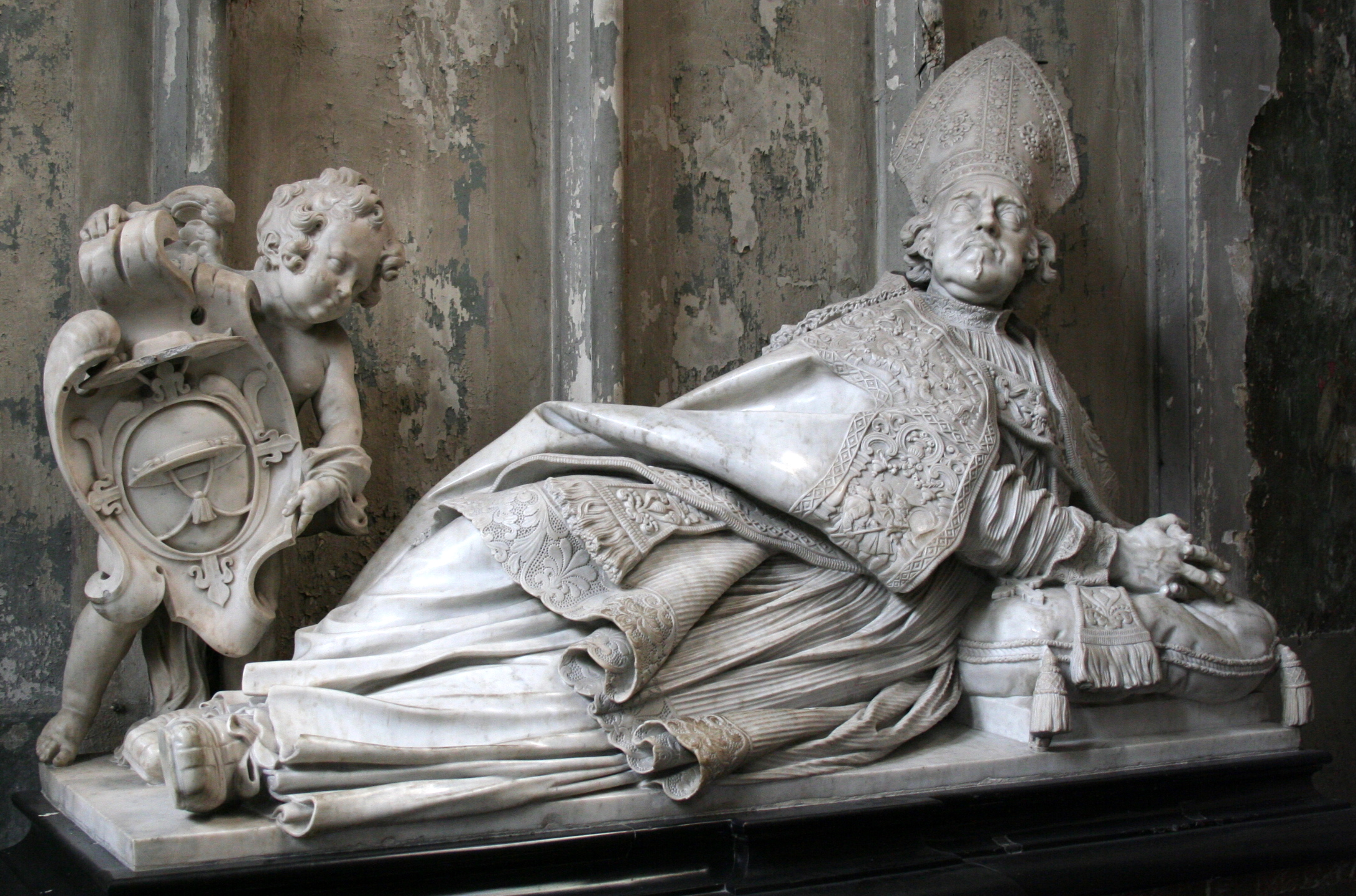
Tomb of bishop Ambrosius Capello, Artus Quellinus II, 17th century

Inside the Cathedral some important graves still can be found, amongst them family members of the noble houses of Rubens, Fourment, Goubau, Tucher, Plantin, Moretus, de Borrekens, etc. Some stones were resited there after Saint-Michael's abbey church was lost.

Bishops

- Laevinus Torrentius
- Ambrosius Capello
- Aubertus van den Eede

Municipal and Grand Almoners of the City

- Aegidius de Brialmont. (+1668) marries to Barbe van Wyck.
- Petrus de Vos (+1719), married to Maria Clara Bosschaert.
- Alexander I Goubau, (1540–1614), married to Anna Anthoni.
- Joannes Beerenbroek, (+1761)
- Hendrik Moens, (+1643): Alderman of Antwerp: married to Maria Fourment, sister of Hélène Fourment.
- Joannes Placquet, (+1652); married to Anne Vermeulen.

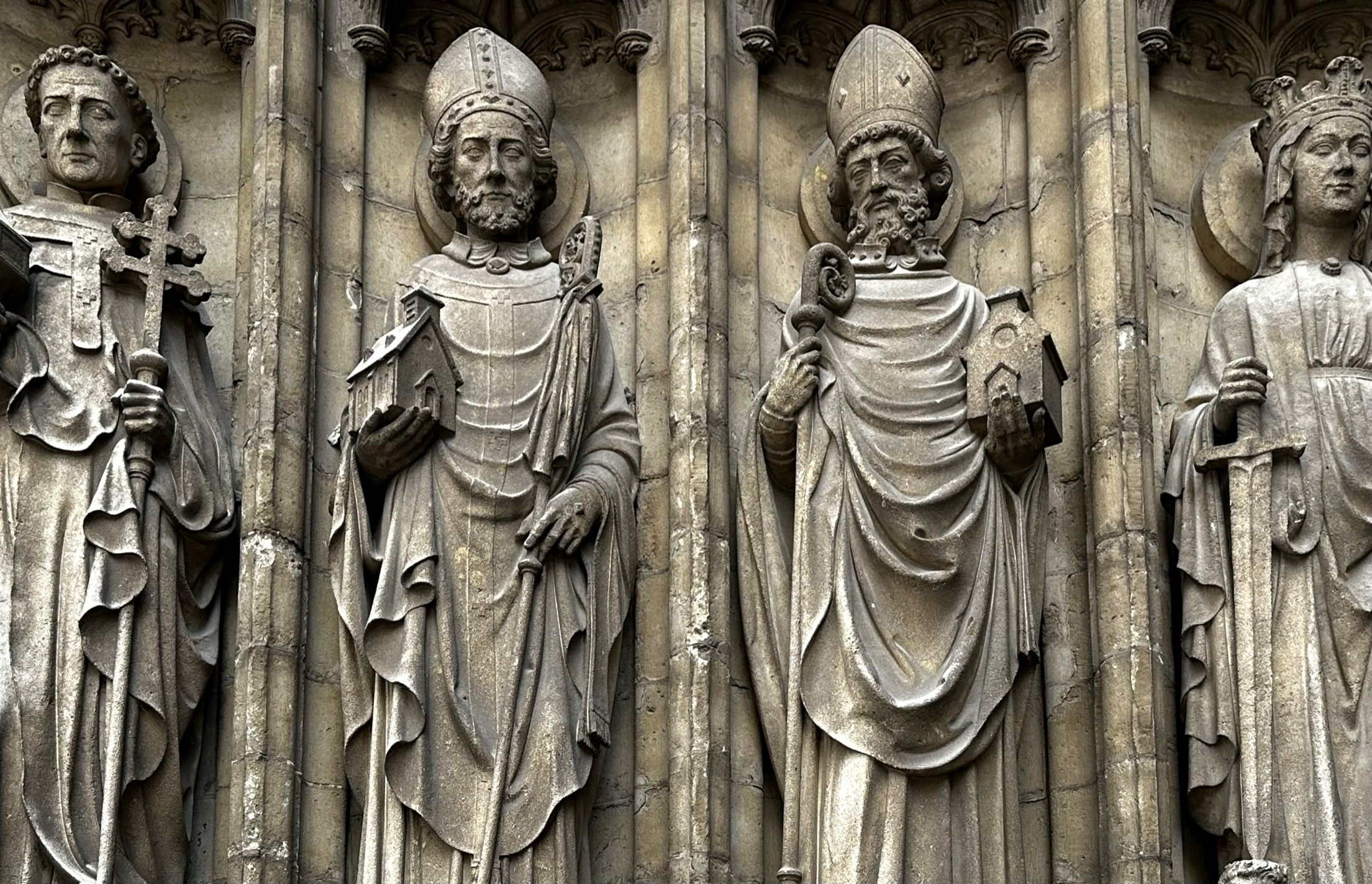
Statues of bishops on the tympanum

- Adriaen Stevens, (+1640) married to Maria Bosschaert.
- Godefridus Joseph van Paeffenrode, (+1763) Alderman of Antwerp.
- Embertus Tholinckx.
- Ludovic van den Heuvel (+1727), knight and Lord of Calfennes.
- Joannes van Colen (+1724), Lord of Burcht.

Artists

- Michiel [de] Vri[e]ndt, (+1637), married to Sara Rabat: Panel-maker of P.P. Rubens.
- Joannes Cnobbaert (+1637), Son of Michaël; married to Marie de Man; Editor and Publisher.
- Simon Jordaens, married to Maria de Bodt.
- Daniël Faes, (+ 1654), book-Editor; married to Sara de Waele.
- Abraham Ortelius (+1598), placed after burials inside Saint-Michaels Abbey.

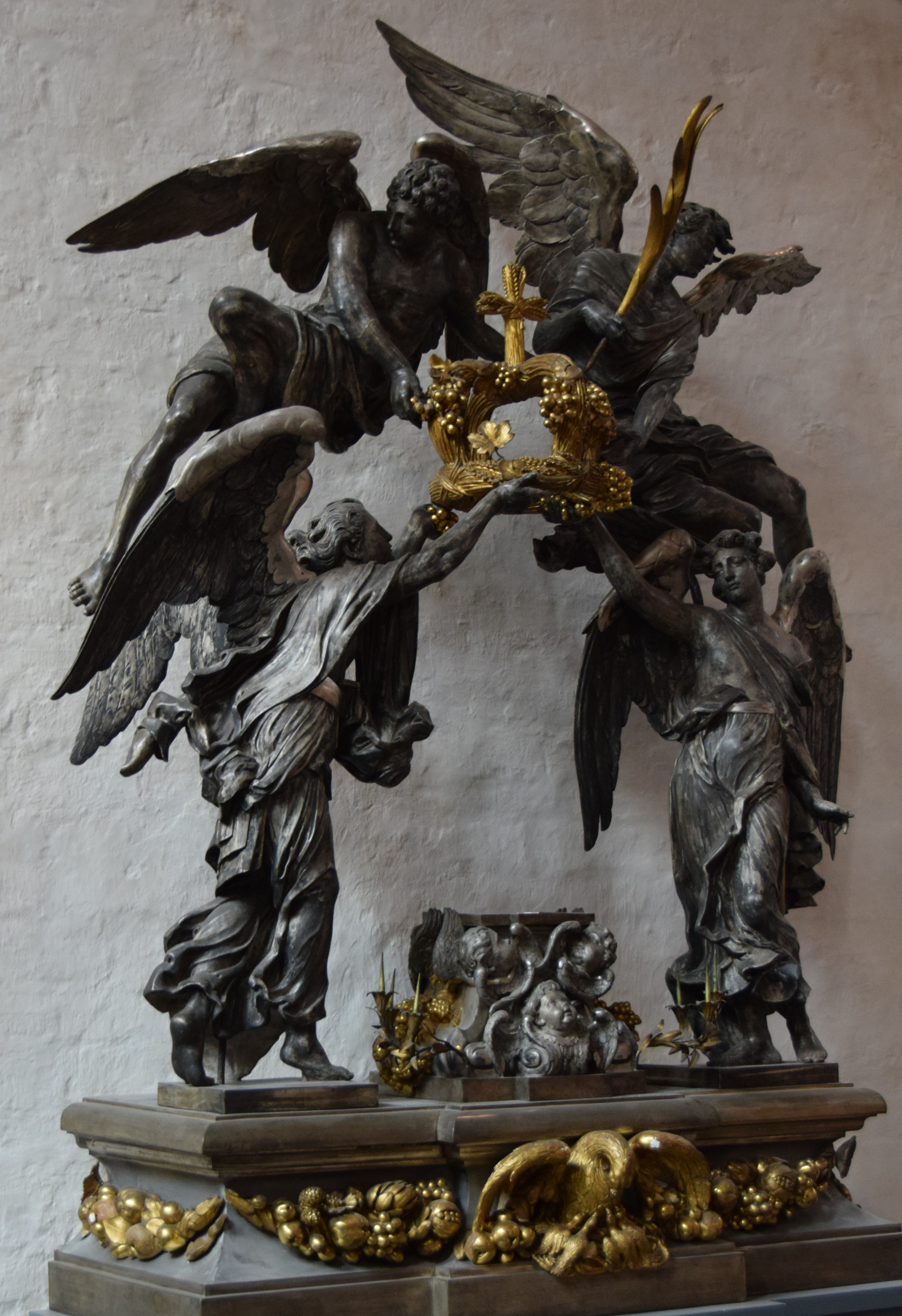
Angel throne, Mattheus van Beveren, 1659

- Cornelis de Vos, marr. Susanne Cock, children Joannes Bptiste and Elisabeth
- Philippus Gallaeus, (+1612), Sculptor, married to Catharina Rollanda.
- Peter Verbrugghen, sculptor. Marr. Cornelia Quellinus
- Jan Wildens, (+1653) marr. Maria Stappaert, niece of Hélène Fourment.
- Nicolaes Somers, marries to Anne de Winter. Dean of the Silver sculptors.
- Henricus de Moy, marr. Clara van Gulick, parents in law of Philip I Rubens.
- Joannes Brantius: iuris conslvltius, married Clara de Moy; parents of Isabella Brant.
- Hubert Waelrant

Politicians

- Michaëllis Cnobbaert (+1623), Alderman, married to Jacominne de Roy.
- Alexander vander Goes (+1642), Alderman, married Maria della Faille.
- Maol Muire Ó hÚigínn, Archbishop of Tuam in Ireland (1586–1590) – died in Antwerp on his return to Ireland from Rome

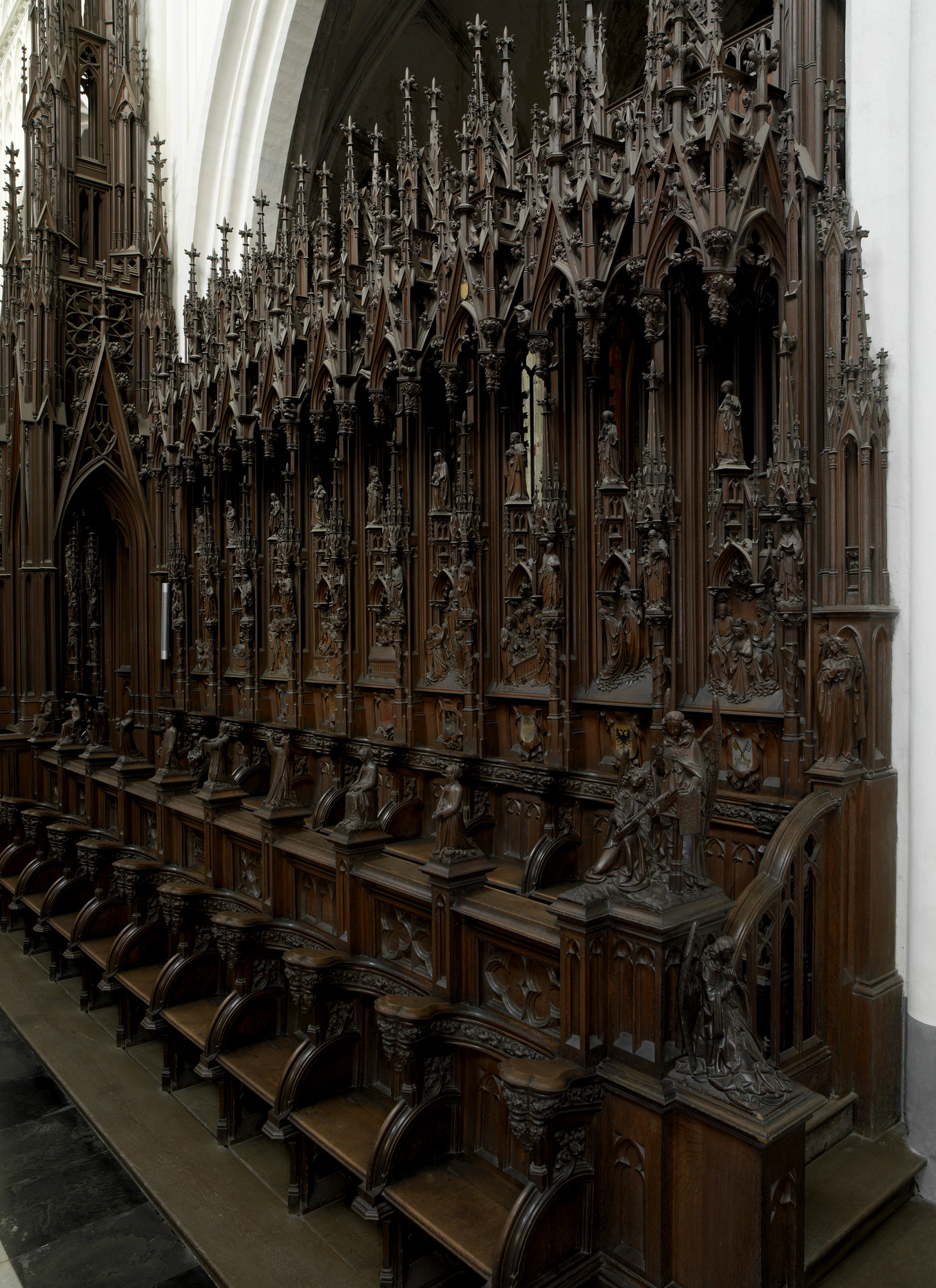
Choir stalls, Frans-Andries Durlet, 19th century

- Maria Goubau, marr. Renald Huygens.
- Thomas de Prêt (+1653), married to Suzanne Fourmenois.
- Gaspar Gevartius, Secretary of the City.
- Jacobis Anthonius de Witte (+1631); royal Councillor and Judge, married to Maria Catharina Mailliart.
- Jacobus della Faille.
- Abraham Verspreet (+1638), married to Elisabeth van der Noot; Greffe of the political Council.
- Henricus Walraevens.
- Reynier Floris.
- Bartholomeus Tucher, (+1542); married to Herberta Dens.

Plantyn family

- Christopher Plantyn, marr. Joanne Riviera.
- Johnnes Moretus, marr. Martina Plantyn.
- Balthasar Moretus, marr. Anne Goos.
- Arnold de Pret, marr. Maria Moretus.

== Facts and figures ==
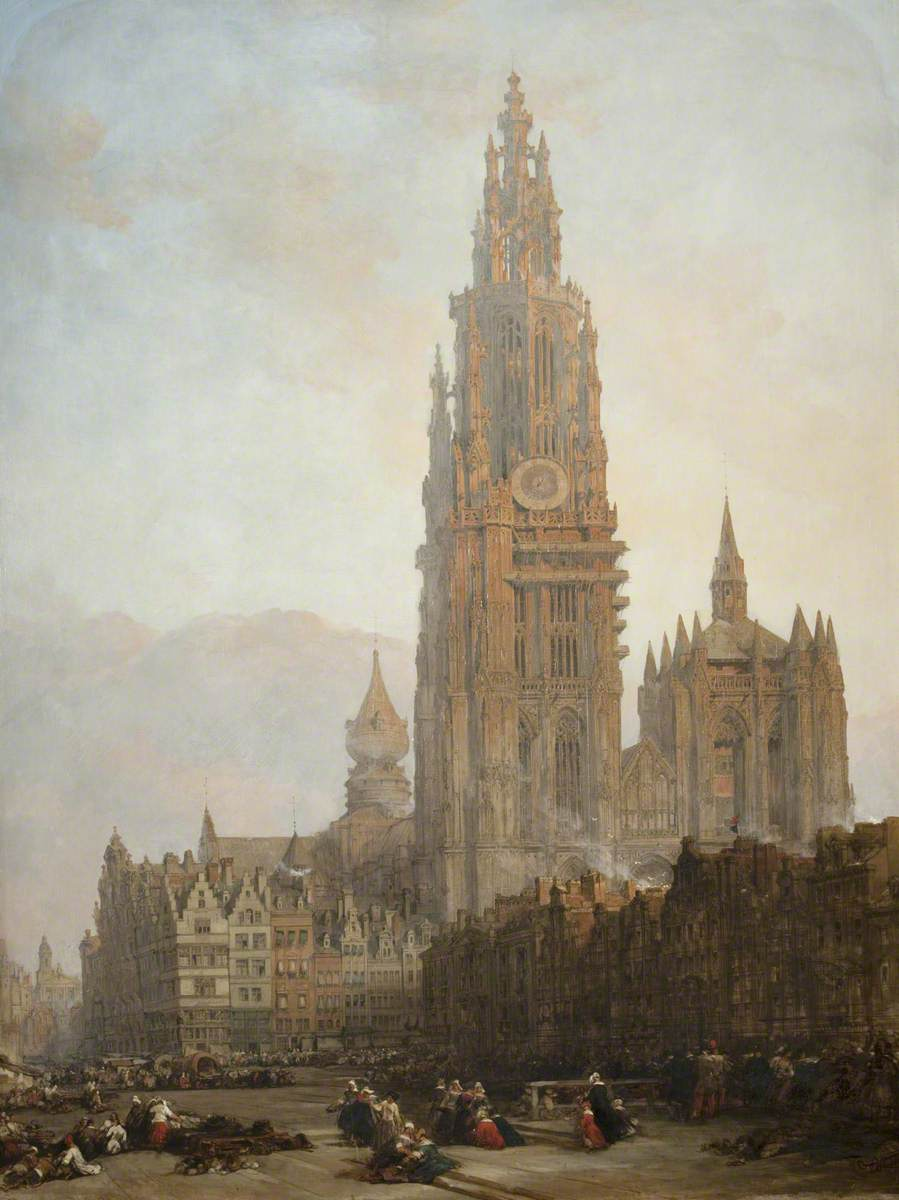
West Front of Antwerp Cathedral by David Roberts, 1847

- Interior length: 118 metres (387 ft)
- North tower height: 123 metres (404 ft)
- South tower height: 65.3 metres (214 ft)
- Central aisle height: 28 metres (92 ft)
- Lantern height or crossing-tower where the nave and transepts meet: 43 metres (141 ft)
- Maximum width of the nave: 53.5 metres (176 ft)
- Total surface area of the floor: 8,000 square metres (86,000 ft^{2})
- Surface area of the roof: more than 10,000 square metres (110,000 ft^{2})
- Capacity: 2,400 seats. In principle, the cathedral can hold 25,000 people.
- The cathedral has 7 aisles, 125 pillars and 128 windows (of which 55 are stained-glass).
- In 1533 there were 57 permanent altars in the cathedral.
- The nineteenth-century Schyven organ has 90 registers and 5,770 pipes.
- The cathedral has a carillon with 49 bells.
- The heaviest bell is Karolus (1507), weighing 6,434 kilograms (14,185 lb).
- Maintenance of the cathedral costs 1.5 million euros per year.

== See also ==
- List of carillons in Belgium
- List of tallest structures built before the 20th century
